= List of New Hampshire railroads =

The following railroads operate in the U.S. state of New Hampshire.

== Common freight carriers ==
- Green Mountain Railroad (GMRC) (owned by Vermont Railway)
- Milford-Bennington Railroad (MBRX)
- New England Central Railroad (NECR) (Genesee and Wyoming)
- New England Southern Railroad (NEGS)
- New Hampshire Central Railroad (NHCR)
- New Hampshire Northcoast Corporation (NHN)
- Pan Am Railways (PAR)
- Pan Am Southern Railroad (PAS) (operated by Pan Am Railways)
- St. Lawrence & Atlantic Railroad (SLR) (Genesee and Wyoming)

== Passenger carriers ==
- Amtrak (AMTK)
- Conway Scenic Railroad (CSRX)
- Hobo Railroad
- Mount Washington Cog Railway (MWRC)
- Silver Lake Railroad
- White Mountain Central Railroad
- Wilton Scenic Railroad
- Winnipesaukee Scenic Railroad

== Defunct railroads ==
Name	Mark	System (Note: This is one or more of the Class I railroads that the railroad became part of, if any.)	From	To	Successor	Notes
Ashuelot Railroad		B&M	1844	1890	Connecticut River Railroad	
Atlantic and St. Lawrence Railroad		CN	1847	1960	Canadian National Railway	
Berlin Mills Railway	BMS			1999	St. Lawrence and Atlantic Railroad	
Boston, Concord and Montreal Railroad		B&M	1844	1890	Concord and Montreal Railroad	
Boston and Lowell Railroad		B&M	1880	1919	Boston and Maine Railroad	
Boston and Maine Corporation	BM	B&M	1963			Still exists as a lessor of Pan Am Railways operating subsidiary Springfield Terminal Railway
Boston and Maine Railroad	B&M, BM	B&M	1835	1964	Boston and Maine Corporation	
Brookline Railroad		B&M	1891	1895	Fitchburg Railroad	
Brookline and Milford Railroad		B&M	1893	1895	Fitchburg Railroad	
Canadian National Railway	CN	CN	1923	1998	St. Lawrence and Atlantic Railroad	
Central Vermont Railroad		CN	1873	1899	Central Vermont Railway	
Central Vermont Railway	CV	CN	1899	1995	New England Central Railroad	
Cheshire Railroad		B&M	1844	1890	Fitchburg Railroad	
Claremont and Concord Railway	CLCO		1954	1988	Claremont Concord Railroad	
Cocheco Railroad		B&M	1847	1863	Dover and Winnipiseogee Railroad	
Concord Railroad		B&M	1835	1890	Concord and Montreal Railroad	
Concord and Claremont Railroad		B&M	1873	1945	Boston and Maine Railroad	
Concord and Claremont Railroad		B&M	1848	1853	Merrimack and Connecticut River Railroad	
Concord and Montreal Railroad		B&M	1890	1919	Boston and Maine Railroad	
Concord and Portsmouth Railroad		B&M	1855	1944	Boston and Maine Railroad	
Connecticut River Railroad		B&M	1849	1919	Boston and Maine Railroad	
Contoocook River Railroad		B&M	1856	1873	Concord and Claremont Railroad	
Contoocook Valley Railroad		B&M	1848	1857	Contoocook River Railroad	
Dover and Winnipiseogee Railroad		B&M	1862	1892	Boston and Maine Railroad	
Dover and Winnipisiogee Railroad		B&M	1839	1841	Boston and Maine Railroad	
Eastern Railroad		B&M	1839	1890	Boston and Maine Railroad	
Eastern Railroad in New Hampshire		B&M	1836	1899	Boston and Maine Railroad	
Fitchburg Railroad		B&M	1847	1919	Boston and Maine Railroad	
Franklin and Bristol Railroad		B&M	1848	1849	Northern Railroad	
Franklin and Tilton Railroad		B&M	1889	1943	Boston and Maine Railroad	
Glen Junction Transfer Company			1897			
Goodwin Railroad	GWIN		1976	1981	North Stratford Railroad	
Grafton Railroad		B&M	1847		Northern Railroad	
Grand Trunk Railway	GT	CN	1853	1923	Canadian National Railway	
Great Falls and Conway Railroad		B&M	1844	1865	Portsmouth, Great Falls and Conway Railroad	
Groton and Nashua Railroad		B&M	1844	1846	Worcester and Nashua Railroad	
Lake Shore Railroad		B&M	1883	1901	Concord and Montreal Railroad	
Maine Central Railroad	MEC	MEC	1888	2003	New Hampshire Central Railroad	
Manchester and Keene Railroad		B&M	1864	1881	Boston and Lowell Railroad/ Concord Railroad	
Manchester and Lawrence Railroad		B&M	1847	1919	Boston and Maine Railroad	
Manchester and North Weare Railroad		B&M	1858	1899	Concord and Montreal Railroad	
Merrimack and Connecticut River Railroad		B&M	1853	1873	Concord and Claremont Railroad	
Monadnock Railroad		B&M	1848	1892	Fitchburg Railroad	
Nashua and Acton Railroad		B&M	1907	1925	N/A	
Nashua, Acton and Boston Railroad		B&M	1872	1906	Nashua and Acton Railroad	
Nashua and Epping Railroad		B&M	1848	1868	Nashua and Rochester Railroad	
Nashua and Lowell Railroad		B&M	1835	1944	Boston and Maine Railroad	
Nashua and Rochester Railroad		B&M	1868	1883	Worcester, Nashua and Rochester Railroad	
New Boston Railroad		B&M	1891	1934	N/A	
New Hampshire Central Railroad		B&M	1848	1853	Merrimack and Connecticut River Railroad	
New Hampshire and Vermont Railroad	NHVT		1989	2000	New Hampshire Central Railroad	
North Stratford Railroad	NSRC		1977	1989	New Hampshire Central Railroad	
Northern Railroad		B&M	1844			
Pemigewasset Valley Railroad		B&M	1874	1947	Boston and Maine Railroad	
Peterborough Railroad		B&M	1866	1944	Boston and Maine Railroad	
Peterborough and Hillsborough Railroad		B&M	1869	1945	Boston and Maine Railroad	
Peterborough and Shirley Railroad		B&M	1846	1860	Fitchburg Railroad	
Portland and Ogdensburg Railroad		MEC	1869	1887	Portland and Ogdensburg Railway	
Portland and Ogdensburg Railway		MEC	1886	1943	Maine Central Railroad	
Portland, White Mountains and Ogdensburg Railroad		MEC	1867	1869	Portland and Ogdensburg Railroad	
Portsmouth and Concord Railroad		B&M	1845	1857	Concord and Portsmouth Railroad	
Portsmouth and Dover Railroad		B&M	1866	1900	Boston and Maine Railroad	
Portsmouth, Great Falls and Conway Railroad		B&M	1865	1890	Boston and Maine Railroad	
Portsmouth, New Market and Concord Railroad		B&M	1845	1845	Portsmouth and Concord Railroad	
Portsmouth, New Market and Exeter Railroad		B&M	1845	1845	Portsmouth and Concord Railroad	
Portland and Rochester Railroad		B&M	1866	1900	Boston and Maine Railroad	
Profile and Franconia Notch Railroad		B&M	1878	1901	Concord and Montreal Railroad	
Sanford and Eastern Railroad			1949	1961		
Sugar River Railroad		B&M	1866	1873	Concord and Claremont Railroad	
Sullivan Railroad		B&M	1846	1866	Sullivan County Railroad	
Sullivan County Railroad	SC	B&M	1866	1949	Boston and Maine Railroad	
Suncook Valley Railroad		B&M	1870	1952	N/A	Became independent from B&M in 1924.
Suncook Valley Extension Railroad		B&M	1889	1947	Concord and Montreal Railroad	Acquired by Suncook Valley Railroad in 1925.
Tilton and Belmont Railroad		B&M	1883	1901	Concord and Montreal Railroad	
Twin State Railroad	TSRD		1984	1999	New Hampshire Central Railroad	
Upper Coos Railroad		MEC	1883	1982	Maine Central Railroad	
Vermont Central Railroad		CN	1871	1873	Central Vermont Railroad	
West Amesbury Branch Railroad		B&M	1868	1893	Boston and Maine Railroad	
White Mountains Railroad		B&M	1848	1873	Boston, Concord and Montreal Railroad	
Whitefield and Jefferson Railroad		B&M	1878	1904	Concord and Montreal Railroad	
Wilton Railroad		B&M	1844	1944	Boston and Maine Railroad	
Wolfeboro Railroad	WLFB		1975	1976	Goodwin Railroad	
Wolfeborough Railroad		B&M	1862	1892	Boston and Maine Railroad	
Worcester and Nashua Railroad		B&M	1845	1883	Worcester, Nashua and Rochester Railroad	
Worcester, Nashua and Rochester Railroad		B&M	1883	1911	Boston and Maine Railroad	

Private carriers

- Sawyer River Railroad
- Wild River Railroad

Electric

- Bay State Street Railway
- Berlin Street Railway
- Boston and Maine Railroad (Concord and Manchester Electric Branch, Portsmouth Electric Branch)
- Boston and Northern Street Railway
- Chester and Derry Railroad
- Claremont Railway
- Claremont Railway and Lighting Company
- Claremont Street Railway
- Concord Street Railway
- Dover, Somersworth and Rochester Street Railway
- Exeter, Hampton and Amesbury Street Railway
- Exeter Street Railway
- Goffs Falls, Litchfield and Hudson Street Railway
- Hampton and Amesbury Street Railway
- Haverhill, Plaistow and Newton Street Railway
- Hudson, Pelham and Salem Street Railway
- Keene Electric Railway
- Laconia and Lakeport Street Railway
- Laconia Street Railway
- Manchester and Derry Street Railway
- Manchester Street Railway
- Manchester and Nashua Street Railway
- Manchester Traction, Light and Power Company
- Massachusetts Northeastern Street Railway
- Nashua Street Railway
- Portsmouth and Exeter Street Railway
- Rochester Street Railroad
- Seabrook and Hampton Beach Street Railway
- Springfield Electric Railway
- Springfield Terminal Railway (ST)
- Union Electric Railway

Not completed

- Portland and Rutland Railroad
- Portland, Rutland, Oswego and Chicago Railroad
