= Samuel Newell Bell =

American politician (1829–1889)

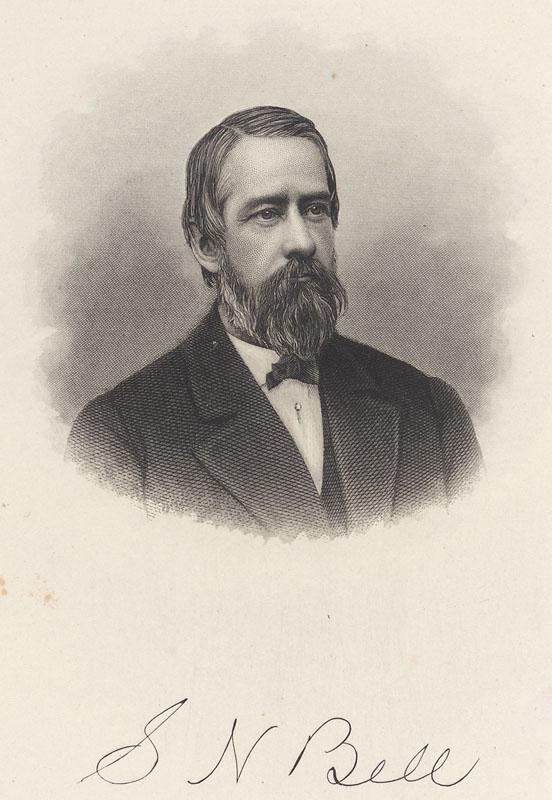

Member of the U.S. House of Representatives from New Hampshire's 2nd district
- In office March 4, 1871 – March 3, 1873
- Preceded by: Aaron F. Stevens
- Succeeded by: Austin F. Pike

Member of the U.S. House of Representatives from New Hampshire's 2nd district
- In office March 4, 1875 – March 3, 1877
- Preceded by: Austin F. Pike
- Succeeded by: James F. Briggs

Personal details
- Born: March 25, 1829 Chester, New Hampshire, New Hampshire, U.S.
- Died: February 8, 1889 (aged 59) North Woodstock, New Hampshire, U.S.
- Resting place: Valley Cemetery, Manchester, New Hampshire
- Party: Democratic
- Relations: Samuel Bell; James Bell
- Education: Phillips Academy; Dartmouth College
- Profession: Lawyer; Politician; Businessman

Samuel Newell Bell (March 25, 1829 – February 8, 1889) was an American lawyer, politician and businessman. He served as a United States representative from New Hampshire in the 1870s.

== Early life ==
Born in Chester, New Hampshire to Samuel Dana Bell and Mary H. (Healey) Bell, he attended local schools in Francestown, New Hampshire and Phillips Academy in Andover, Massachusetts. After graduating from Dartmouth College in 1847, he studied law in the office of his father and was admitted to the bar in 1849. He began the practice of law in Meredith, New Hampshire.

== Career ==
Elected as a Democratic candidate to the Forty-second Congress, Bell was a United States representative for the second district of New Hampshire. He served from March 4, 1871 to March 3, 1873. He was an unsuccessful candidate for reelection in 1872 to the Forty-third Congress, but was elected to the Forty-fourth Congress, serving from March 4, 1875 to March 3, 1877. He was not a candidate for reelection in 1876.

After leaving Congress, Bell resumed the practice of law in Meredith. He was also involved in real estate and was one of the founders of the New Hampshire Fire Insurance Company. He served as director and vice-president of the company from 1881 until his death. Bell served as president of several railroads, including the Portsmouth and Concord Railroad, the Suncook Valley Railroad, the Pemigewasset Valley Railroad and the Franconia Notch Railroad.

He was appointed chief justice of the New Hampshire Superior Court by Governor Ezekiel A. Straw and later by Governor James A. Weston but declined to accept the appointment both times, and retired from public life.

== Death ==
Bell died while on a visit in North Woodstock on February 8, 1889 (age 59 years, 320 days). He is interred in Valley Cemetery in Manchester, New Hampshire.

== Personal life ==
Bell was the grandson of Samuel Bell, the 14th Governor of New Hampshire, and the nephew of James Bell, United States Senator.

U.S. House of Representatives
Preceded by Aaron F. Stevens	Member of the U.S. House of Representatives from New Hampshire's 2nd congressional district 1871 – 1873	Succeeded by Austin F. Pike
Preceded by Austin F. Pike	Member of the U.S. House of Representatives from New Hampshire's 2nd congressional district 1875 – 1877	Succeeded by James F. Briggs
