= Springfield Terminal Railway =

Springfield Terminal Railway may refer to:

- Springfield Terminal Railway (Illinois) in northeastern Springfield, Illinois, incorporated 1908; crossed Sangamon Avenue just west of the Illinois Terminal Railroad crossing
- Springfield Terminal Railway (Vermont), incorporated 1923, now part of the CSX system; succeeded the Springfield Electric Railway
