= Northern Railroad (New Hampshire) =

Coordinates: 43.550°N 71.892°W

- Extent of the Northern Railroad in 1890
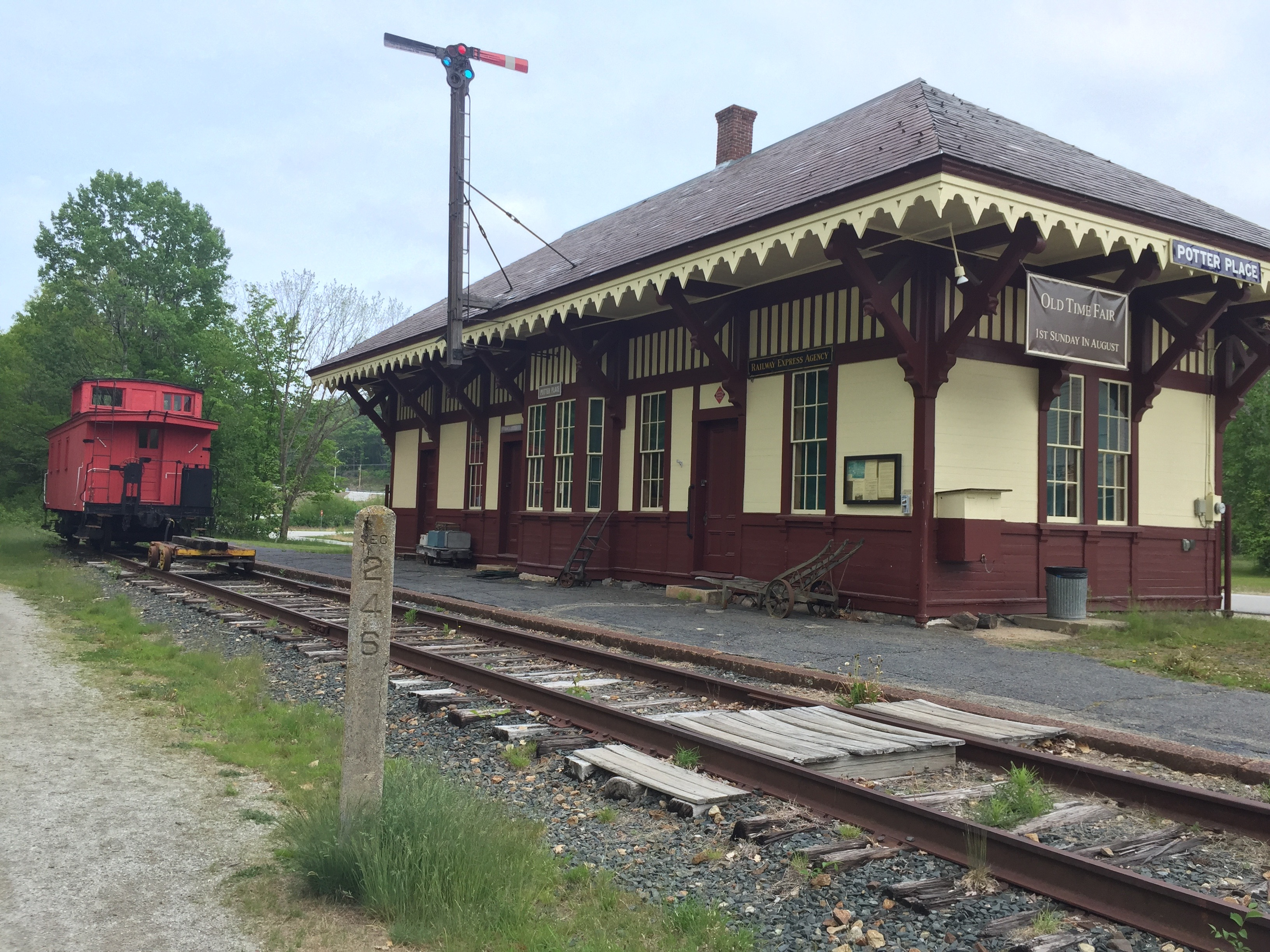
- Potter Place Station (1874) in Andover, NH

Overview
- Headquarters: Concord, New Hampshire
- Locale: New Hampshire
- Dates of operation: 1847–1890
- Successor: Boston and Maine

Technical
- Track gauge: 4 ft 8 1/2 in (1,435 mm) standard gauge
- Length: 172 mi (277 km) (1890)

The Northern Railroad (sometimes called the Northern New Hampshire Railroad) was a U.S. railroad in central New Hampshire. Originally opened from Concord to West Lebanon in 1847, the Northern Railroad become part of the Boston and Maine system by 1890.

By the time of its lease, the Northern operated three railroads totaling 172 route-miles (277 km) on 201 miles (323 km) of track, of which nearly 82 route-miles (132 km)/99 miles (159 km) of track were owned directly by the Northern. In 1884, the last year for which data was reported, it reported 30,067,806 ton-miles of revenue freight and 7,465,569 passenger-miles.

== History ==
=== Construction ===
The Northern Railroad was first chartered in New Hampshire as the Northern Railroad Company on June 18, 1844. In the incorporating act, the Northern was originally to build from "any point in the towns of Concord or Bow... to the east or west bank of the Connecticut River, at some point in the towns of Haverhill or Charlestown, or betwixt the same on said Connecticut River, on such route as shall be deemed most expedient." It was soon found that this charter contained no provisions that allowed the Northern to take land, and as such, the railroad was re-chartered on December 27 of the same year. At this time, the end of the line was redesignated as Lebanon.

Following its organization in the following July, the railroad broke ground on October 8, 1845. The first segment of the line, from Concord to Franklin, was opened December 28, 1846 and operated by the Concord Railroad. By September 1, 1847, the Northern took operation of the route to Canaan, and by November 17, had finally reached its terminus in West Lebanon. An extension was then built to White River Junction, across the Connecticut River in Vermont, in June, 1848, where it connected with the Vermont Central Railroad and the Connecticut and Passumpsic Rivers Railroad.

Daniel Webster spoke at the 1847 ribbon-cutting in Lebanon, proclaiming "It is altogether new. The world has seen nothing like it before." Not in attendance among the 1,200 at the inauguration of the "steam highway" were any of the Shaker community from nearby Enfield. During the construction of the railroad, the Shakers had worked a deal with the railroad to relocate its proposed corridor to the northern side of Mascoma Lake, away from their colony. A stock purchase sealed the bargain.

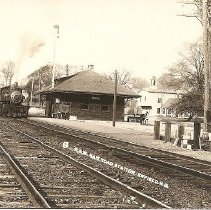
B&W Railroad Station; Enfield, New Hampshire; ca. 1906

In July 1846, while the Northern was under construction, the Franklin and Bristol Railroad Company was chartered to run the 13 miles (21 km) from Franklin on the Northern main line to Bristol. Prior to its opening on July 2, 1848, it was leased to the Northern for 100 years, effective in April of that year. With little prospect for a return on the cost of building a road to "waterfalls now waste and desolate", on January 31 following, after passage of an act of the New Hampshire Legislature, the Franklin and Bristol was consolidated with the Northern Railroad and became known as its Bristol Branch.

=== Growth ===
In the 1860s and 1870s, the Northern was under the control of Onslow Stearns, who served as president of the railroad from 1852 until his death in 1878. The Northern thrived under his leadership, and the yearly gross income of the road rose from nearly $364,000 in 1861 to $500,000 in 1881, while passenger-miles increased from 3.6m to 5.9m and revenue freight increased from 12.6m to 29.4m ton-miles over the same period.

In 1870, the Northern attempted consolidation with the Concord Railroad under the name of the Concord and Northern Railroad, but this consolidation was terminated in September of that year when the latter railroad entered receivership. This was soon followed by a court decision that found that the Concord Railroad's board of directors had entered into the contract to avoid its management being passed to a new board of directors.

The constituent parts of the Northern Railroad in 1890: Northern Railroad (Main Line) Northern Railroad (Bristol Branch) formerly Franklin & Bristol Railroad Concord & Claremont Railroad (Main Line) formerly Merrimac & Connecticut Rivers Railroad Concord & Claremont Railroad (Main Line) formerly Sugar River Railroad Concord & Claremont Railroad (Hillsborough Branch) formerly Contoocock River Railroad Peterborough & Hillsborough Railroad

The 1880s signaled change for the Northern. The failures of other New Hampshire railroads in the 1860s and 1870s had led to control of the Concord and Claremont Railroad and the Peterborough and Hillsborough Railroad falling to the more successful Northern by 1880, among others. (Note: The Northern also controlled the Sullivan County Railroad following its bankruptcy in 1866, but the line was subsequently leased to the Vermont Central Railroad rather than operated by the Northern. The line was eventually sold to the Vermont Valley Railroad in 1880.) The route of the Concord and Claremont was the product of an 1873 consolidation of three railroads, the Merrimac and Connecticut Rivers, the Sugar River, and the Contoocook River. The first two paralleled the route of the Northern and connected to the Connecticut River further south, near Claremont, while the Contoocook River Railroad served as a branch line to Hillsborough. There, it connected to the Peterborough and Hillsborough, which was constructed between 1877 and 1878 to the end of the Monadnock Railroad in Peterborough.

=== Acquisition ===
By 1884, the shareholders of the Northern had decided to lease its lines to the Boston and Lowell Railroad for a period of 99 years. A minority of shareholders soon filed suit against the company to annul the lease, seeking to compel a distribution of the company's surplus rather than accept a flat percentage on stock. The New Hampshire Supreme Court ruled in favor of the shareholders, and on July 1, 1887, the Northern resumed direct operation of its lines.

Following the New Hampshire Legislature's inability to pass a bill permitting a renewal of the lease with the Boston and Lowell under substantially similar terms, and seeking to avoid the expenses of directly operating the railroad, the Northern contracted with the Boston and Maine Railroad to operate the line in November of that year, beginning effective January 1, 1888. In order to avoid violating the previous court decision, this contract merely provided for the recovery of the net revenue generated by the Boston and Maine on its lines, rather than a fixed-rate lease.

Once the Legislature passed an appropriate bill in 1889, the operating contract with the Boston and Maine was terminated, and a new 99-year lease was granted to the Boston and Lowell (which subsequently assigned it back to the Boston and Maine) on December 7 of that year, effective January 1, 1890.

=== 20th century ===
Boston and Maine traffic was heavy to Quebec ports on the St. Lawrence River for both immigrants and freight to Europe. Trains ran from Boston to White River Junction with continuing service north into Canada, via the Central Vermont Railway to Montreal, and the Boston and Maine to Sherbrooke for Quebec City. One train to Montreal was still running in the 1960s.

However, like many other railroads, the former Northern main line saw a decline in rail traffic in the post-war period. While the Bristol Branch had already been abandoned in 1937 following the New England flooding of 1936, the main line from Concord to White River Junction saw the cessation of passenger service in 1965 and the gradual winding down of freight service to a decreasing number of customers. The Boston and Maine system itself was reorganized in 1970, resulting in the suspension of lease payments to remaining Northern Railroad stockholders.

The line was used infrequently after 1973, most notably by the Freedom Train in 1975. It was briefly used for the final time in 1982 when the Boston and Maine line along the Connecticut River was blocked following a derailment in Brattleboro. After formal abandonment of the line in 1992 by Guilford Rail System, the successor to the Boston and Maine, the State of New Hampshire purchased 59 miles (95 km) of the corridor in 1995 from Boscawen to Mile 140.00 in Lebanon to create the Northern Rail Trail. Three years later, the state acquired the remaining two miles to White River Junction, including the large Westboro Rail Yard, which was subsequently leased to the Claremont Concord Railroad and a local business. A notice of intent to abandon the last remaining 6.63 miles (10.67 km) segment of the Northern Railroad main line from Concord to Boscawen was filed with the Surface Transportation Board in September 2016.

The Northern Railroad corridor was part of a Boston-Montreal High Speed Rail Study in 2003.

== See also ==
- Concord and Montreal Railroad
- Cheshire Railroad
- New Hampshire Historical Marker No. 256: Gerrish Depot
