= Cyrus Barton =

American politician (died 1855)

Cyrus N. Barton (died February 17, 1855) was a newspaper publisher and politician in New Hampshire who also served as a U.S. Marshal. He operated a newspaper printing businesses in several New Hampshire cities.

== Career ==
Barton served as a state senator from 1833 to 1835, representing the 4th District. He was appointed Marshal of New Hampshire in 1846. He served as president of the common council of the city of Concord. He was a leader of New Hampshire's Republican nominating convention for candidates, including Martin Van Buren for U.S. president. He was a director of the Contoocook Valley Railroad.

A newspaper publisher, he produced the New Hampshire Patriot with Isaac Hill. Hill and Barton had a legal dispute in 1841 over the establishment of the New Hampshire Patriot & Gazette. He also published the State Capital Reporter. In addition, he published other materials, including reports from the state prison warden, New Hampshire geology, state legislature documents, and a report from the trustees of New Hampshire's Insane Asylum.

Barton died February 17, 1855.
