= Manchester Street Railway =

Interurban railway line in New Hampshire, US

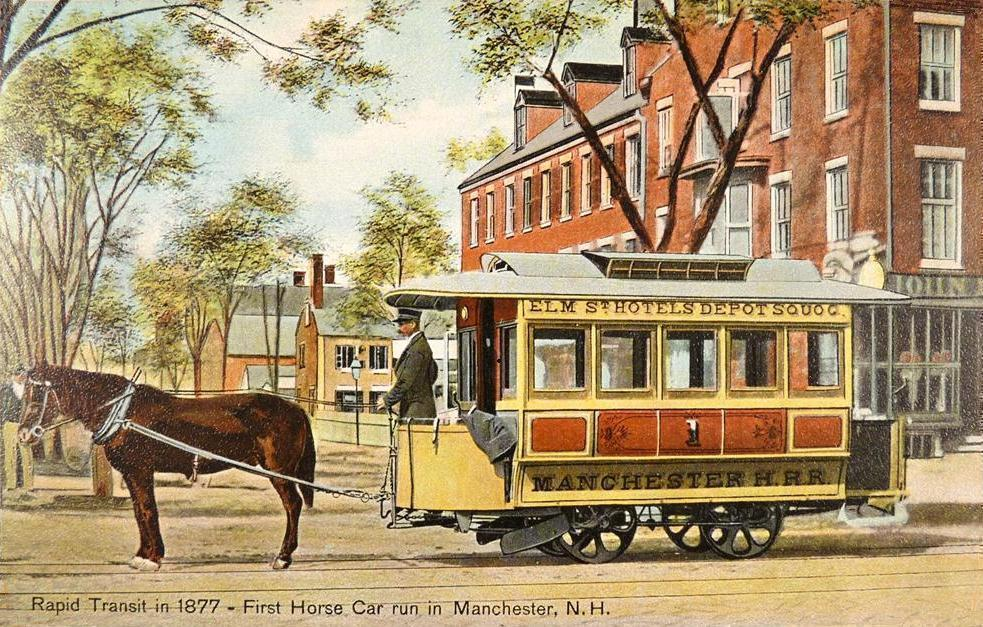
- 1908 postcard entitled "Rapid transit in 1877 - First horsecar run in Manchester, New Hampshire"

Overview
- Locale: Manchester and Nashua, New Hampshire
- Dates of operation: 1864–1941

Technical
- Track gauge: 4 ft 8 1/2 in (1,435 mm) standard gauge
- Electrification: Electrified interurban light rail

The Manchester Street Railway was a light interurban railway that ran from Manchester to Nashua, New Hampshire.

== History ==
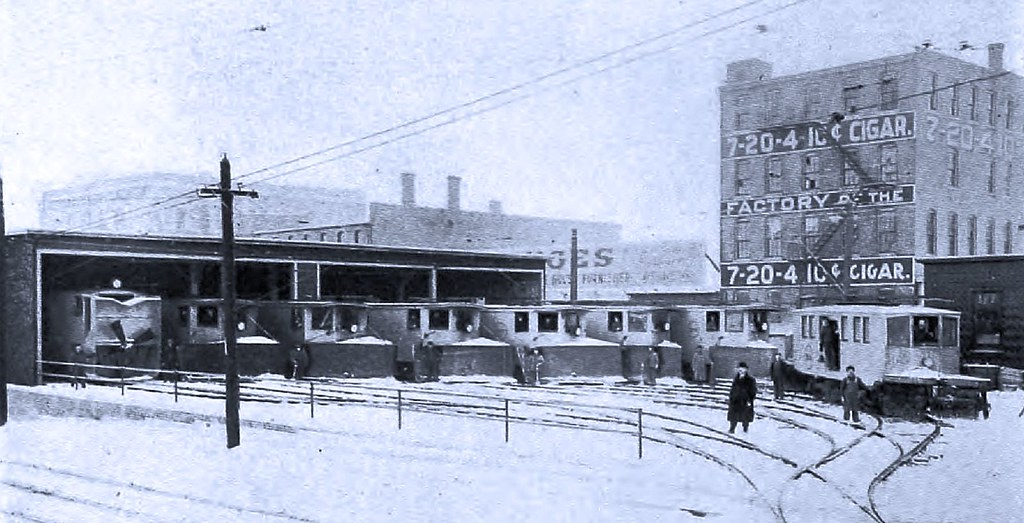
Wason plows from the Wason Manufacturing Company in Manchester, NH. (1909) Note the sign advertising Cuban cigars.

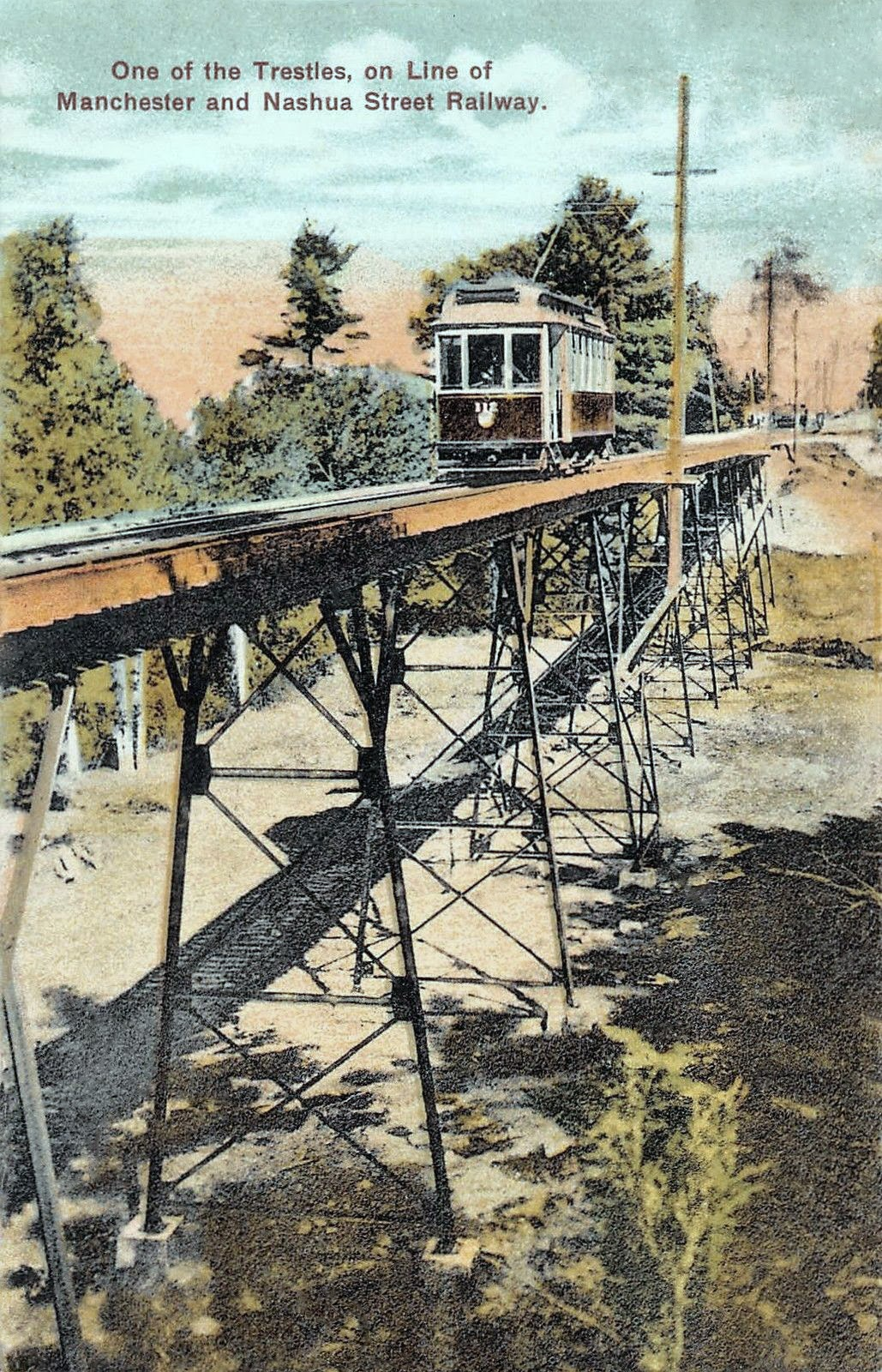
Manchester Street Railway Trestle between Manchester and Nashua. (1907)

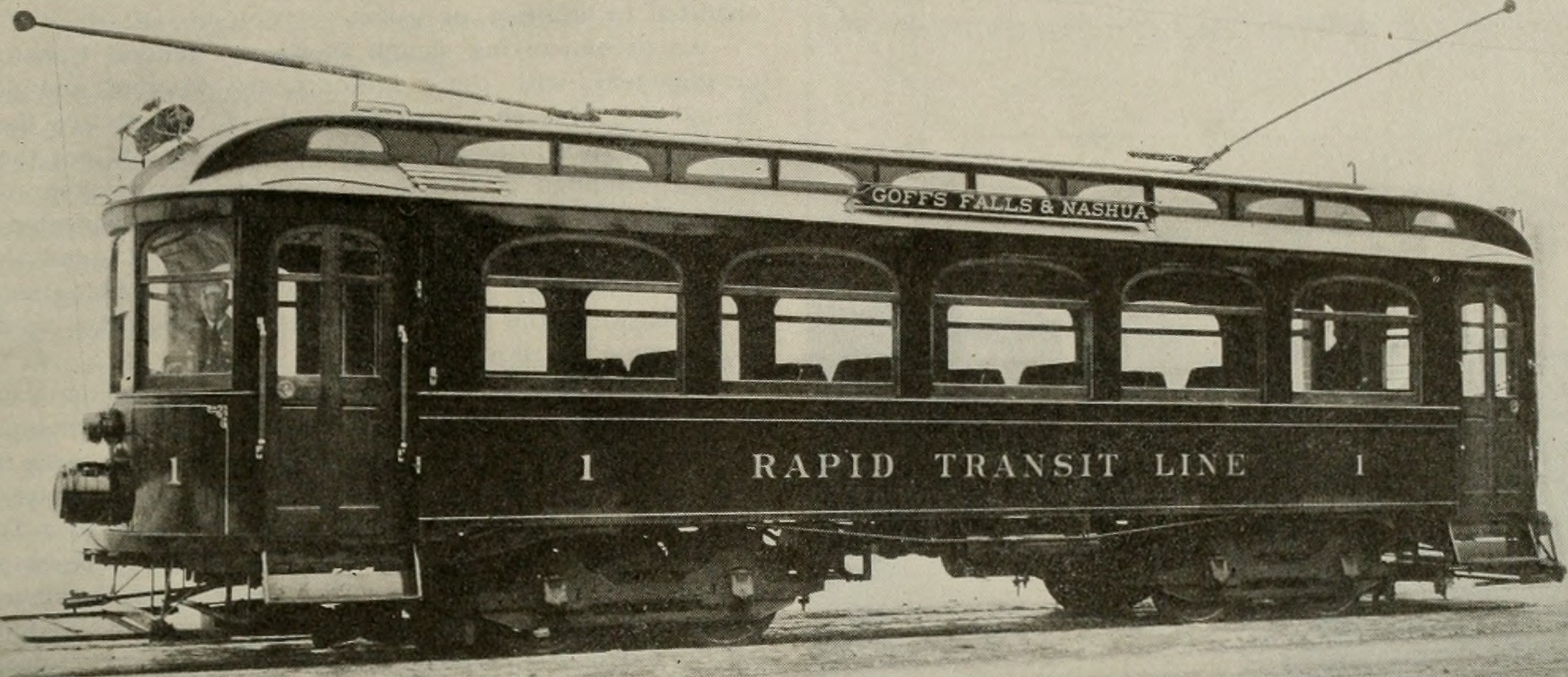
Manchester Street Railway No. 1. (1906)

The Manchester Horse Railroad Company was incorporated in 1864. The company changed its name to the Manchester Street Railway in 1889, which in turn was renamed the Manchester Traction Light & Power Company in 1901. In 1903 the Goff's Falls, Litchfield & Hudson Street Railway Company was incorporated. In 1905 the Manchester Street Railway's main car barn burned down, so they ordered 11 Laconia cars numbered 94 - 116 in even numbers. Many of the Manchester Street Railway's cars were manufactured by the Laconia Car Company in Laconia, New Hampshire. The Goff's Falls, Litchfield & Hudson Street Railway Company was renamed the Manchester and Nashua Street Railway in 1907. Near the end, the railway couldn't afford to keep lines energized after hours, and scrappers would climb the poles and dismantle the lines. The Manchester Street Railway ceased operations in 1939, and most of their equipment was scrapped by 1941.

Manchester "Rapid" No. 38 was the Seashore Trolley Museum's second car (and first intact car, as the museum's first car, Biddeford and Saco No. 31, was initially acquired without trucks), was obtained from the Manchester Street Railway. This car was the last electric streetcar known to operate in Manchester under its own power, running off home rails and onto the transport bound for Seashore using its own motors.

== Preservation ==
=== Preserved rolling stock ===
There are several Manchester Street Railway cars preserved and operational.

- No. 38 was built in 1906. It is the last trolley to cross the Merrimack River and the second car in the Seashore Trolley Museum's collection in Kennebunkport, Maine. The car is preserved operational, running on the last known operational set of Laconia 8B trucks. It is equipped with K-28 controllers and 4 GE 80, 40-horsepower motors. It features plush upholstered seats, large windows, and higher-speed gearing for the light interurban service in which it ran.
- A small executive parlor car, built in 1898 by the Briggs Carriage Co. of Amesbury, MA, is also preserved at Seashore. The car body was acquired in the early 1960s after being used as a children's play-house. The car, named "City of Manchester", has been restored to fully-operational condition and is operated for special service.
- The Connecticut Trolley Museum has Manchester Street Railway No. 94 stored, but unrestored. In 1905 the Manchester Street Railway's main car barn burned down, so they ordered 11 Laconia cars numbered 94 - 116 in even numbers.
- The Seashore Trolley Museum has Brill No. 60 from 1895 in storage unrestored.
Operational preserved cars

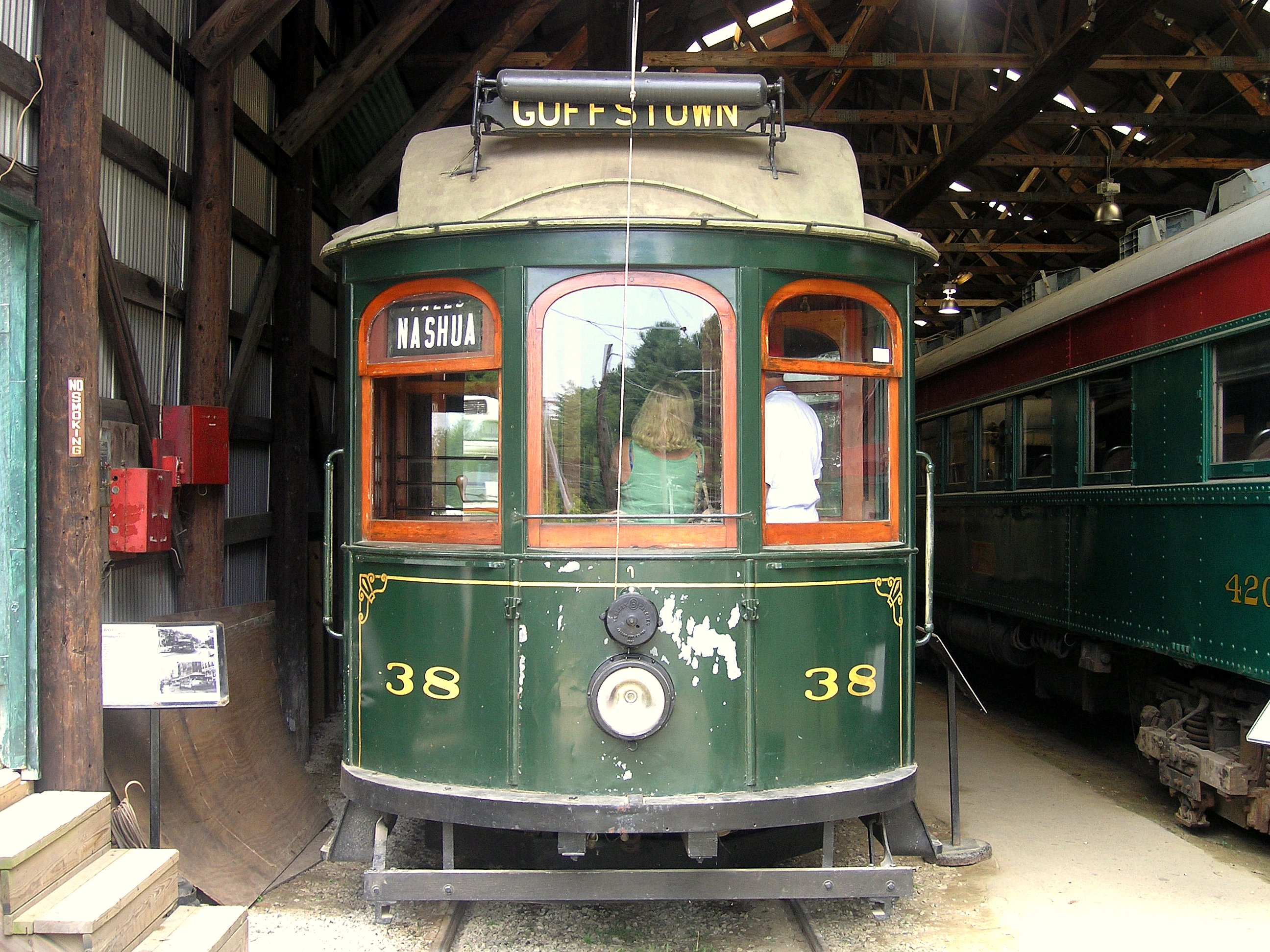
Manchester Street Railway 38

== See also ==
- Concord and Claremont Railroad
- Boston and Maine Railroad
- Maine Central Railroad
- List of New Hampshire railroads
- Springfield Terminal Railway (Vermont)
