= Boston, Barre and Gardner Railroad =

Defunct railroad in Massachusetts

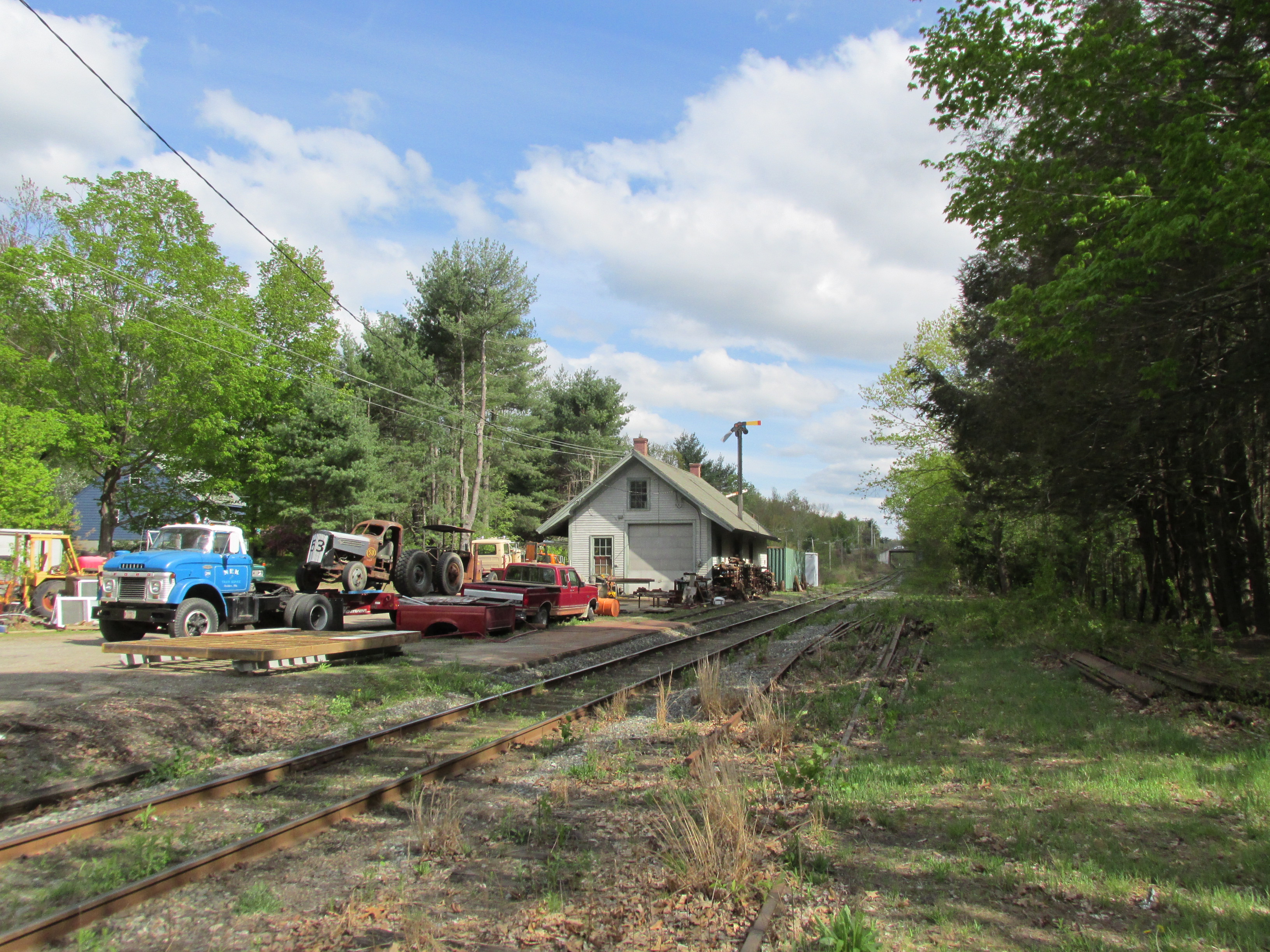
- The former Holden station next to active tracks

Overview
- Operator: Providence and Worcester Railroad; Pan Am Railways
- Dates of operation: 1871–1885
- Successor: Fitchburg Railroad

Technical
- Track gauge: 4 ft 8 1/2 in (1,435 mm) standard gauge
- Length: 36.0 miles (57.9 km)

The Boston, Barre and Gardner Railroad was a railroad in Massachusetts that connected Worcester and Winchendon via Gardner. It was originally chartered as the Barre and Worcester Railroad in 1847, before being renamed the Boston, Barre and Gardner Railroad in 1849. The company was unable to raise funds for construction until 1869; service between Worcester and Gardner began in 1871. An extension northward to Winchendon was completed in January 1874. The Boston, Barre and Gardner operated independently until it was taken over by the Fitchburg Railroad in 1885. Despite the company's name, it never served Boston or Barre. The line was abandoned between Winchendon and Gardner in 1959 by the Fitchburg's successor, the Boston and Maine Railroad. In the 21st century, freight service on the remainder of the line is operated by the Providence and Worcester Railroad between Worcester and Gardner, and by Pan Am Railways on a short segment in Gardner.

== History ==
=== Formation and construction ===
Originally chartered as the Barre and Worcester Railroad by businessmen in Worcester in 1847, the company changed its name to the Boston, Barre and Gardner Railroad in 1849. It was originally intended to connect Worcester with Barre and Palmer, and its charter authorized it along a westward route towards those two cities. The railroad's promoters could not raise funds to begin construction at the time, leaving the company a railroad only in name until 1869. In September of that year, the city of Worcester voted by an overwhelming margin to give the company $200,000 in aid, allowing construction to begin.

With the passage of 20 years since the original charter, the company changed its original plans and decided instead to build northward towards Gardner, and requested a modification of its charter by the Massachusetts General Court in late 1869. The legislature approved this change, and the Boston, Barre and Gardner formally changed its route in March 1870. An additional change was made to route the railroad directly through the town of Holden, which had contributed $30,000 towards the railroad's construction and offered an additional $14,800 on the condition that the company directly served the town. Construction was completed from Worcester to Gardner in 1871, and the company ran its first trains that year. The change to the company's route meant it never reached Barre, and despite its name the company never planned to directly serve Boston.

=== Operating history ===
By 1872, the railroad was described as "a decided success" on account of brisk traffic, and began plans to build further north from Gardner to Winchendon, a distance of 10 miles (16 km). This extension was opened in January 1874. In August 1874, the railroad's board of directors voted to lease the Monadnock Railroad, extending the Boston, Barre and Gardner's tracks from Winchendon to Peterborough, New Hampshire. The railroad also decided to extend the Monadnock from its Peterborough terminus northward 18 miles (29 km) to Hillsboro, where it would connect with the Contoocook River Railroad, providing a route to Concord. This lease was ended in 1880, as the railroad could no longer afford to pay it.

A major collision occurred on the railroad on December 20, 1876, in Princeton when a northbound passenger train collided head on with a southbound mixed train. The accident resulted in one fatality and four injuries, two potentially fatal. In December 1881, the Massachusetts Central Railroad completed a connection to the Boston, Barre and Gardner in Holden, allowing the latter company a connection to Boston.

A second disaster struck the railroad on November 28, 1883. In North Worcester, a passenger train derailed and "the rear car, containing about 65 persons, was hurled from the track and rolled down a 25 feet embankment, rolling twice and a half times over and landing on its side. All the seats were wrenched from their positions and the passengers thrown about in inextricable confusion." As a result of the derailment, at least 30 people were severely injured and at least seven killed.

=== Merger into the Fitchburg ===
The Fitchburg Railroad concluded an agreement to purchase the Boston, Barre, and Gardner Railroad in early 1885, with the Fitchburg taking over operations on March 4 pending legislative approval. The following month, the Massachusetts General Court authorized the Fitchburg to consolidate the Boston, Barre, and Gardner, formally ending the latter's existence as a railroad company. As a part of the Fitchburg system, the Boston, Barre and Gardner's lines remained busy, with the Fitchburg describing its purchase of the company as "very satisfactory" in 1887.

=== To the present day ===
In 1900, the Fitchburg was leased by the Boston and Maine Railroad (B&M). The B&M continued to operate the line between Winchendon and Worcester until 1959, when the final 10 miles (16 km) between Winchendon and Gardner were abandoned, truncating the line 1 mile (1.6 km) north of the former Fitchburg line that met the Boston, Barre and Gardner in downtown Gardner.

Falling on hard times in the 1970s, the Boston and Maine abandoned nearly all of the line in 1972, leaving only the stub track in Gardner. The portion of the former Boston, Barre and Gardner route south of Gardner was saved when the newly independent Providence and Worcester Railroad (P&W) purchased the line and reopened it in 1974, as a means of connecting with the Boston and Maine. As of 2021, the P&W (owned by shortline railroad holding company Genesee & Wyoming since 2016) continues to operate its portion of the Boston, Barre and Gardner between Worcester and Gardner, while Boston and Maine successor Pan Am Railways operates the remaining portion of the line in Gardner.

Portions of the right-of-way in Winchendon and northern Gardner have been converted to a rail trail, the North Central Pathway. In 2022, the state awarded $200,000 for design of an extension into downtown Gardner.

== Station and junction listing, 1917 ==
Miles (km)	City	Station	Connections and notes
0.0 (0.0)	Worcester	Worcester	Junction with Boston and Albany Railroad, Norwich and Worcester Railroad, and Providence and Worcester Railroad
0.8 (1.3)	Worcester	Lincoln Square	
2.9 (4.7)	Worcester	Barbers	Junction with Worcester, Nashua and Rochester Railroad
4.4 (7.1)	Worcester	North Worcester	
6.2 (10.0)	Holden	Chaffin	
7.3 (11.7)	Holden	Dawson	
8.3 (13.4)	Holden	Holden	
9.5 (15.3)	Holden	Jefferson	
10.1 (16.3)	Holden	—	Crossing of Central Massachusetts Railroad on a bridge, with a junction track slightly north
11.2 (18.0)	Holden	North Woods	
13.1 (21.1)	Princeton	Brooks	
16.0 (25.7)	Princeton	Princeton	
20.1 (32.3)	Hubbardston	Hubbardston	
26.3 (42.3)	Gardner	Gardner	Junction with Fitchburg Railroad
27.1 (43.6)	Gardner	Heywood	
32.4 (52.1)	Winchendon	Red School	
36.0 (57.9)	Winchendon	Winchendon	Junction with Cheshire Railroad, Ware River Railroad, and Monadnock Railroad
