= New Hampshire Central Railroad =

Freight railroad in New Hampshire

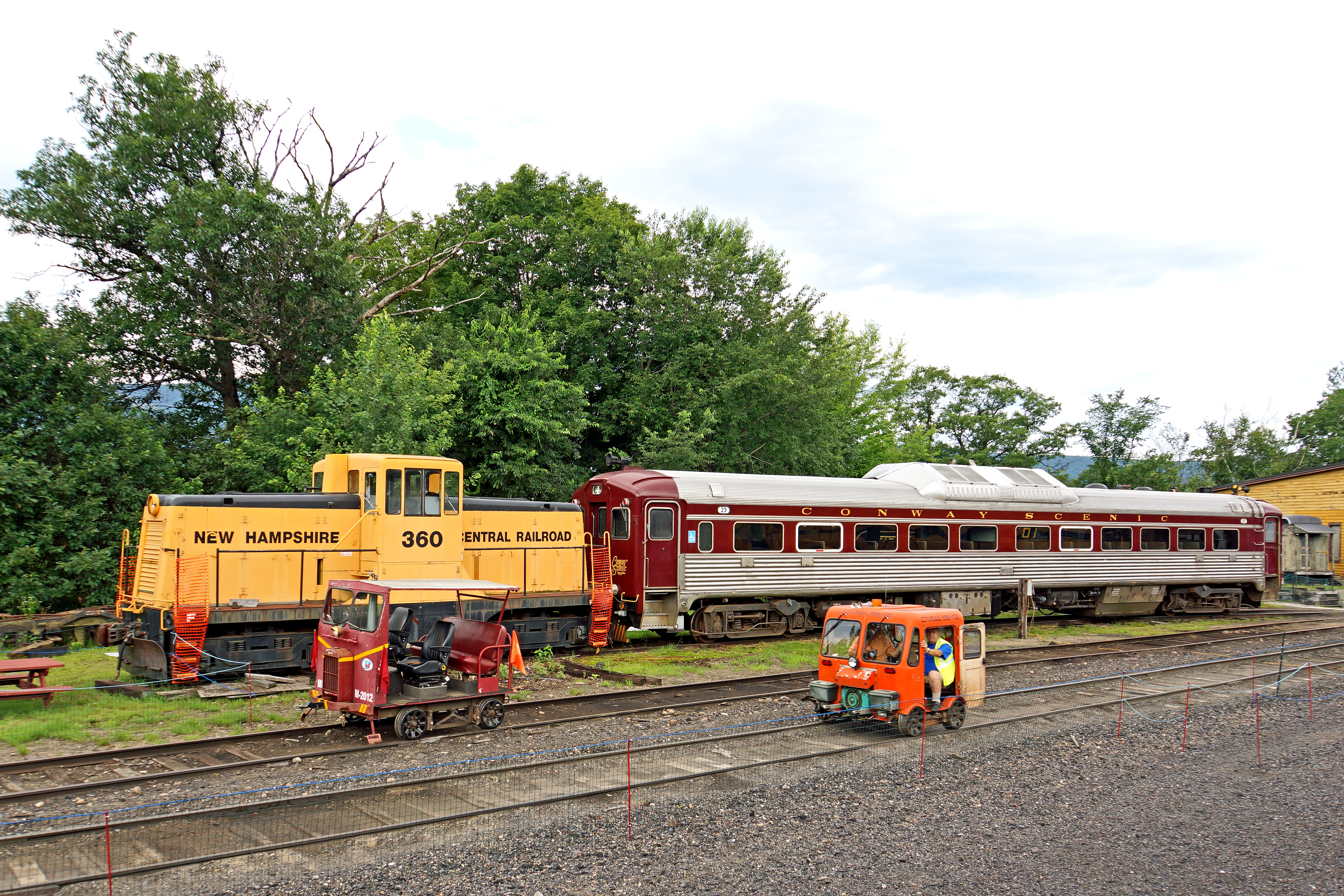
- A New Hampshire Central locomotive in 2013

Overview
- Headquarters: North Stratford, New Hampshire
- Reporting mark: NHCR
- Dates of operation: 1993–present

Technical
- Track gauge: 4 ft 8 1/2 in (1,435 mm) standard gauge
- Length: 9 miles (14 km)

The New Hampshire Central Railroad is a freight railroad in New Hampshire and Vermont, United States. Founded in 1993, the railroad operates several branch lines owned by the state of New Hampshire.

== History ==
The company initially began operations on a 9-mile (14 km) railroad line between North Stratford and Columbia, New Hampshire, previously operated by the North Stratford Railroad. The NHCR also has rights to operate two other lines in New Hampshire: the Groveton Branch between Groveton and Whitefield, and the Berlin branch between Whitefield and Littleton. Interchange is with the St. Lawrence and Atlantic Railroad in North Stratford and Groveton.

Vermont Rail System announced an agreement to purchase the New Hampshire Central Railroad in April 2024. The New Hampshire Central Railroad will maintain operations under its original name following acquisition.
