= Concord-Lake Sunapee Rail Trail =

Rail trail in New Hampshire, US

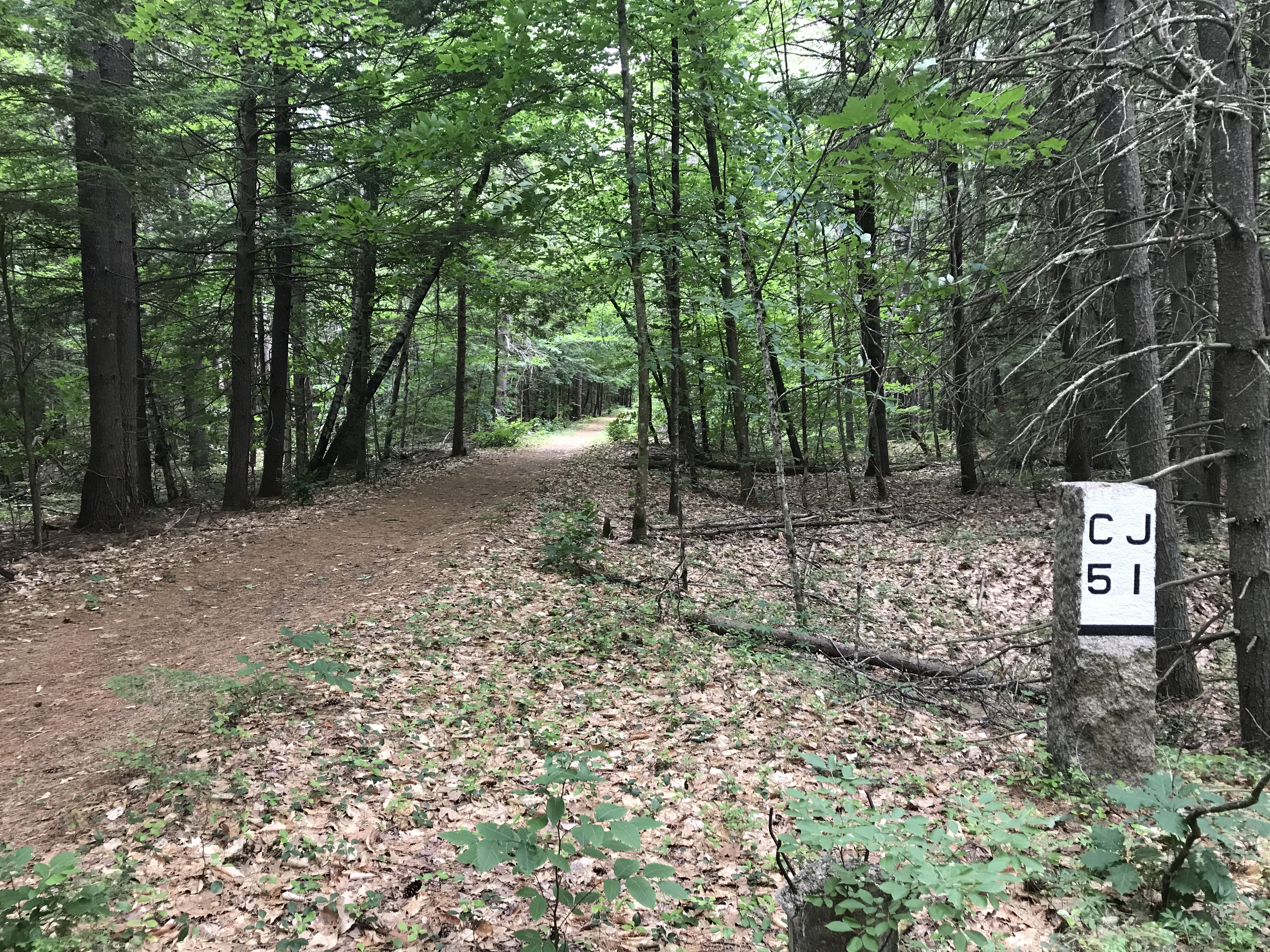
- Concord Lake Sunapee Rail Trail
- Length: 34 mi (55 km)
- Location: Concord, New Hampshire; Hopkinton, New Hampshire; Warner, New Hampshire; Sutton, New Hampshire; Bradford, New Hampshire; Newbury, New Hampshire
- Use: Bicycling, walking, horseback riding, cross-country skiing
- Right of way: Former railroad line
- Website: concordlakesunapeerailtrail.com

The Concord-Lake Sunapee Rail Trail is a 34-mile (55 km), gravel mixed-use rail trail in central New Hampshire that is currently under construction, under control of the Friends of the Concord-Lake Sunapee Rail Trail (FCLSRT). It roughly follows the course of the Concord and Claremont Railroad line, starting in Concord and passing through the towns of Hopkinton, Warner, Sutton, and Bradford, and ending in Newbury at Lake Sunapee. The trail is being designed for use by walkers, cyclists, equestrians, and cross-country skiers.

== History ==
The Concord-Lake Sunapee Rail Trail sits on the former Claremont Branch of the Boston and Maine Railroad. The line was originally part of the Concord and Claremont Railroad that connected Concord and Claremont, which was opened on September 21, 1848.

The Boston & Maine Railroad took over the line in 1887 and referred to it as their "Claremont Branch". The line was eventually sold to Samuel Pinsly in 1954 who set up the Claremont & Concord Railway, operating a brief passenger service (ending in 1955) and regular freight as far as Contoocook and West Henniker.

Passenger rail on the line had a surprising rebirth for eight weeks in the summer of 1961. Between July 22 and September 17, the tracks between Bradford and Sunapee were used by F. Nelson Blount and his Monadnock, Steamtown & Northern Railroad, a tourist excursion railroad. The operation utilized a former Canadian National Railway 4-6-4T steam locomotive, #47, and several former Boston & Maine wooden coaches. The steam operation came to an early end on August 25 when the locomotive was removed from service on account of missing maintenance paperwork, which had been disposed of by the Canadian National when they retired #47 in 1958. A diesel replacement was used for an additional seven days, but was not popular. This was the last regularly scheduled passenger service on the Claremont Branch.

After World War II, with the decline of rail transportation and increased usage of the automobile, freight use of the line diminished. Claremont and Concord Freight service last ran as far as Contoocook in 1961, Bradford in 1964, and Newport in 1977. Some concrete signal bases, rail rests and mile markers can still be seen.

The Friends of the Concord-Lake Sunapee Rail Trail formed in early 2018 and began negotiating easement rights on properties where the original right-of-way ran. Work is ongoing with various sections being completed.

== Features ==
The Concord-Lake Sunapee Rail Trail travels along a flat and scenic landscape through wetlands, ponds, woods, farmlands, and for several miles travels along the Contoocook River.

Improvements to completed trail sections include bench seating, informational kiosks, bicycle repair stations, historic mile-marker repairs, railroad bridge re-decking and vehicular gates.

== See also ==
- List of rail trails
