= Austin F. Pike =

American politician (1819–1886)

Austin Franklin Pike
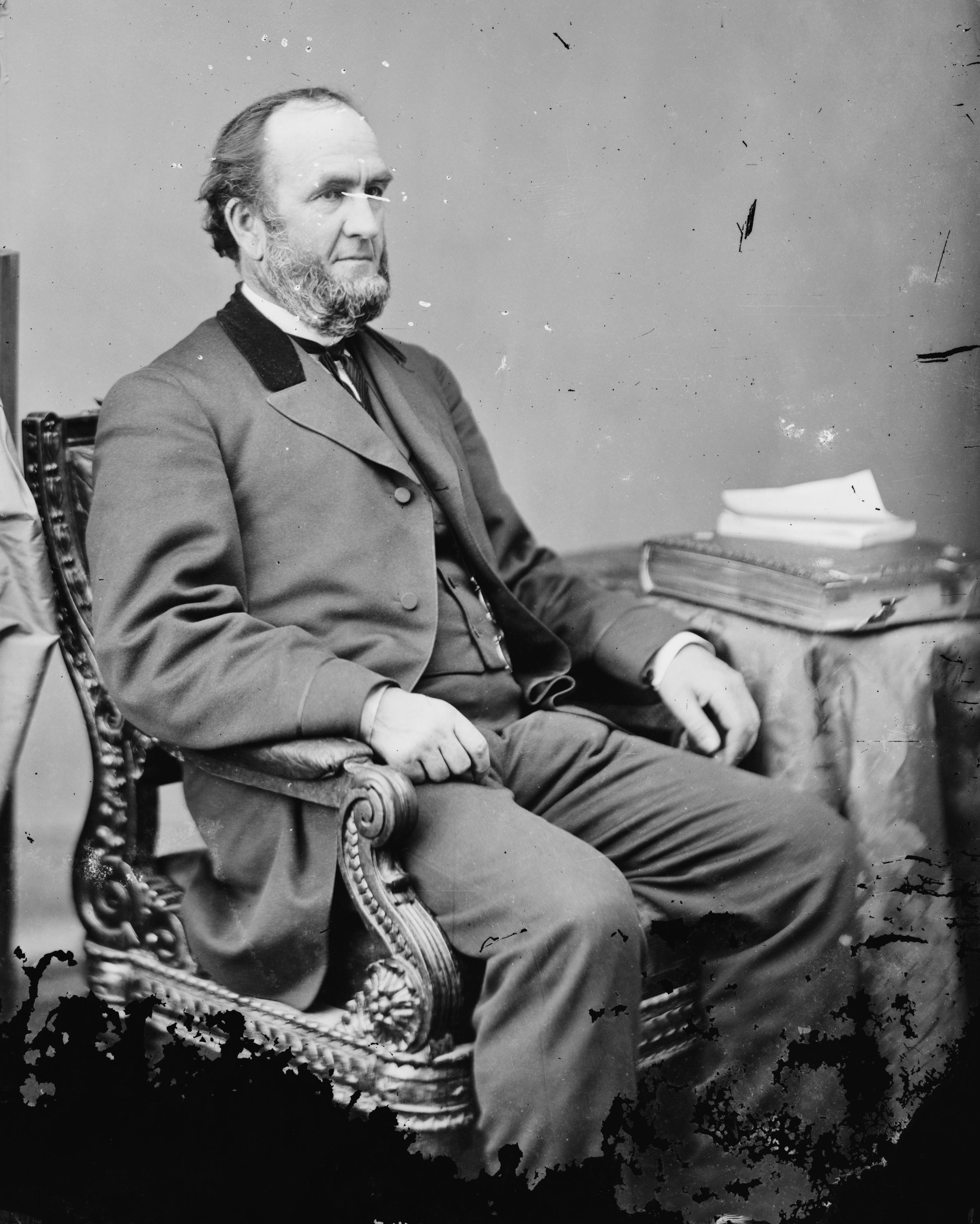

United States Senator from New Hampshire
- In office March 4, 1883 – October 8, 1886
- Preceded by: Edward H. Rollins
- Succeeded by: Person C. Cheney

Member of the U.S. House of Representatives from New Hampshire's 2nd district
- In office March 4, 1873 – March 3, 1875
- Preceded by: Samuel N. Bell
- Succeeded by: Samuel N. Bell

President of the New Hampshire Senate
- In office 1858–1858
- Preceded by: Moody Currier
- Succeeded by: Joseph A. Gilmore

Member of the New Hampshire Senate
- In office 1857–1858

Speaker of the New Hampshire House of Representatives
- In office 1865–1866
- Preceded by: William E. Chandler
- Succeeded by: Simon G. Griffin

Personal details
- Born: October 16, 1819 Hebron, New Hampshire
- Died: October 8, 1886 (aged 66) Franklin, New Hampshire
- Party: Republican

Austin Franklin Pike (October 16, 1819 – October 8, 1886) was a United States representative and senator from New Hampshire. Born in Hebron, New Hampshire, he pursued an academic course, studied law, and was admitted to the bar of Merrimack County in 1845. He was a member of the New Hampshire House of Representatives from 1850 to 1852 and in 1865–1866, and served as speaker during the last two years. He was a member of the New Hampshire Senate in 1857–1858, serving as president the last year.

Pike was elected as a Republican to the Forty-third Congress (March 4, 1873 – March 3, 1875) and was an unsuccessful candidate for reelection in 1874 to the Forty-fourth Congress. He was elected as a Republican to the U.S. Senate after a lengthy deadlocked election in the New Hampshire Legislature and served from August 2, 1883, until his death. While in the Senate, he was chairman of the Committee on Claims (Forty-eighth and Forty-ninth Congresses). He died in Franklin, New Hampshire; interment was in Franklin Cemetery.

== Personal life ==
Pike married twice; he married his second wife, Caroline White, in 1850 and had three children with her - Helen, Edward E., and Leila. His daughter Helen married Frank Nesmith Parsons, Pike's law partner from 1879 until his death; Parsons was later Chief Justice of the New Hampshire Supreme Court (1902–1924).

== See also ==
- List of members of the United States Congress who died in office (1790–1899)

Political offices
Preceded by Moody Currier	President of the New Hampshire Senate; 1858	Succeeded by Joseph A. Gilmore
Preceded by William E. Chandler	Speaker of the New Hampshire House of Representatives; 1865 – 1866	Succeeded by Simon G. Griffin
U.S. House of Representatives
Preceded by Samuel Newell Bell	Member of the U.S. House of Representatives from New Hampshire's 2nd congressional district March 4, 1873 – March 3, 1875	Succeeded by Samuel Newell Bell
U.S. Senate
Preceded by Edward H. Rollins	U.S. senator (Class 2) from New Hampshire; August 2, 1883 – October 8, 1886; Served alongside: Henry W. Blair	Succeeded by Person C. Cheney
