= New England Southern Railroad =

Overview
- Headquarters: Canterbury, New Hampshire
- Reporting mark: NEGS
- Locale: New England
- Dates of operation: 1982–present

Technical
- Track gauge: 4 ft 8 1/2 in (1,435 mm) standard gauge

Other
- Website: newenglandsouthernrailroad.com

The New England Southern Railroad's corporate logo

The New England Southern Railroad (reporting mark NEGS) is a Class III shortline railroad that operates out of Canterbury, New Hampshire, and serves industries in central New Hampshire, in the United States.

== History ==
In 1975, the Boston & Maine Railroad Corporation filed to abandon its 73-mile (117 km) "White Mountain Branch" stretching between Concord and Lincoln. Recognizing the need of the on-line customers and the potential of the line for a sewer right-of-way, the State of New Hampshire purchased the branch and sought a shortline railroad to carry out operations. The first to assume this responsibility was the Wolfeboro Railroad, which operated the line as their "Central Division" in 1976, but soon thereafter ended operations. The Goodwin Railroad, an extension of Weaver Bros. Construction, was created in 1977 to operate the trackage, and did so until it too ended operations in 1980. Following the demise of the Goodwin contract, the North Stratford Railroad stepped in as an interim operator until the state could find a dependable and permanent long-term operator.

Peter Dearness, a businessman, educator, and shortline railroader, who had a hand in founding the Massachusetts Central Railroad in 1975, approached the State of New Hampshire with a bid to operate the trackage with his newly formed New England Southern Railroad. The railroad was incorporated first in Nevada on December 22, 1981. (Dearness had been out of state working with Kenneth Coombs on the Cadillac & Lake City Rwy. (CLK) harvest season's grain operations, between the UP and BN in CO and KS.) --and then in Massachusetts by Ch. 32, Acts of 1981 on April 12, 1982. Dearness had originally imagined this new railroad as a shortline system with operations only in Western Massachusetts, before learning of the NH White Mountain Branch situation, for which he submitted a bid.

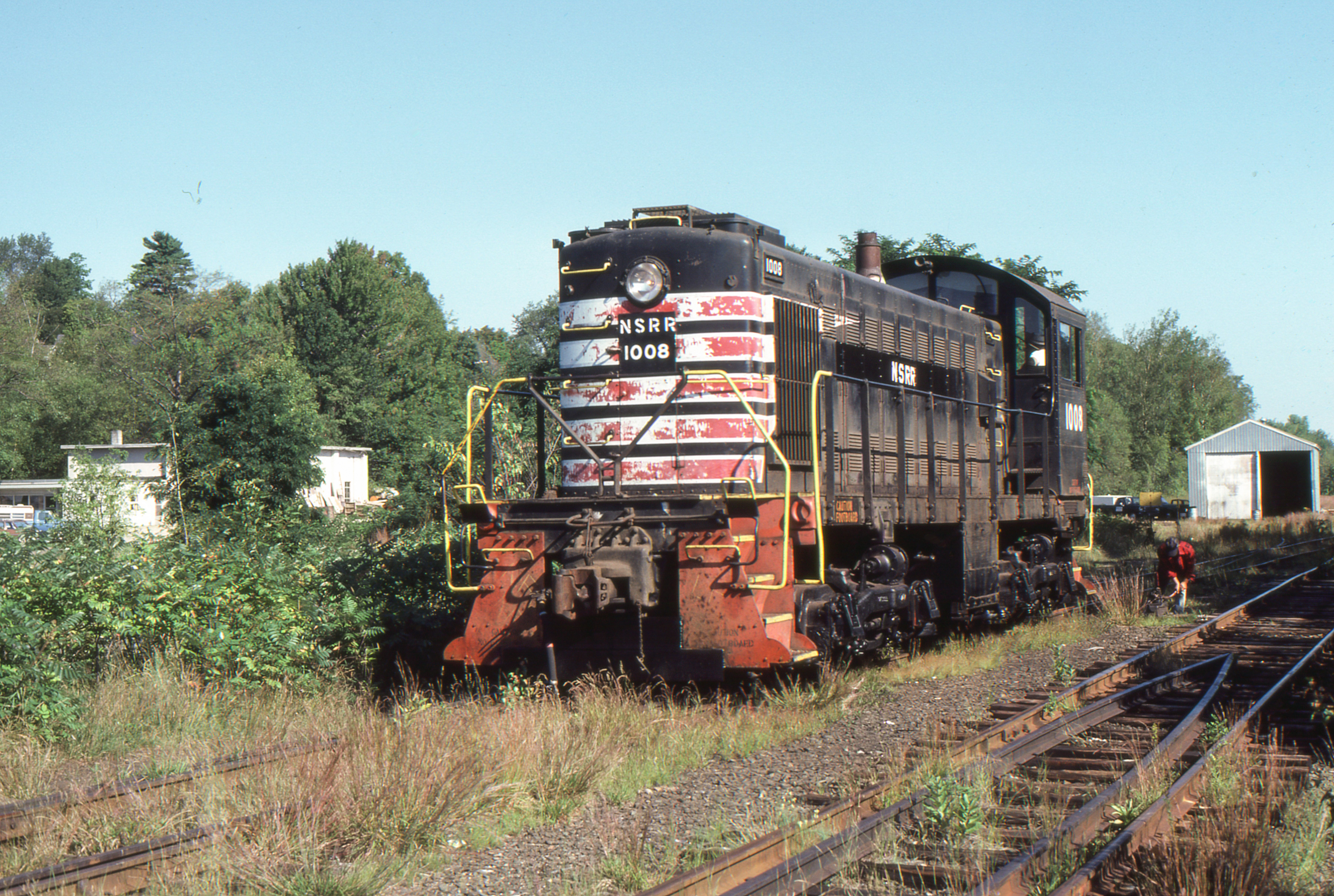
New England Southern 1008 at Lakeport, NH, on August 21, 1981, still lettered up for predecessor North Stratford Railroad. William J. Madden photo, Rick Kfoury collection.

Dearness' railroad won the contract, and in 1982 the operating contract was awarded to the New England Southern, which began freight operations on September 3, 1982, using State of New Hampshire-owned ALCO S1 1008. The railroad also leased a GE 44-ton switcher, #2, also state-owned. The first freight run consisted of a tanker for Home Gas in Northfield, a boxcar for Blue Seal Feeds (H.K. Webster) in Lakeport, and another boxcar of casting sand for Arwood Manufacturing in Tilton. The railroad made regular trips to Rochester Shoe Tree in Ashland, Quin-T Corp. in E. Tilton, Blue Seal Feeds in Plymouth, Gerrity Lumber in Meredith, and a number of other freight customers centered around Lake Winnipesaukee including the former Laconia Car Co. foundry, Allen-Rogers Mill, NESSIE, a combination of the railroad's early reporting marks, NES, and the nickname of the Chesapeake and Ohio Railway, the "Chessie System") provided freight service solely on the White Mountain Branch until 1984, when it entered talks with Penacook (an exception being the Merrimack Station Coal Plant, which would continue to be served by the late B&M President Alan Dustin to assume switching rights in Concord. An agreement was worked out not only for switching rights in the capital but freight rights on the B&M's Northern Mainline between Manchester B&M and later Guilford coal trains. The New England Southern made its inaugural freight run to Manchester on July 14, 1985, using leased Maine Central EMD GP7 581, on loan from Guilford (which had purchased the Maine Central in 1981 and the B&M in 1983).

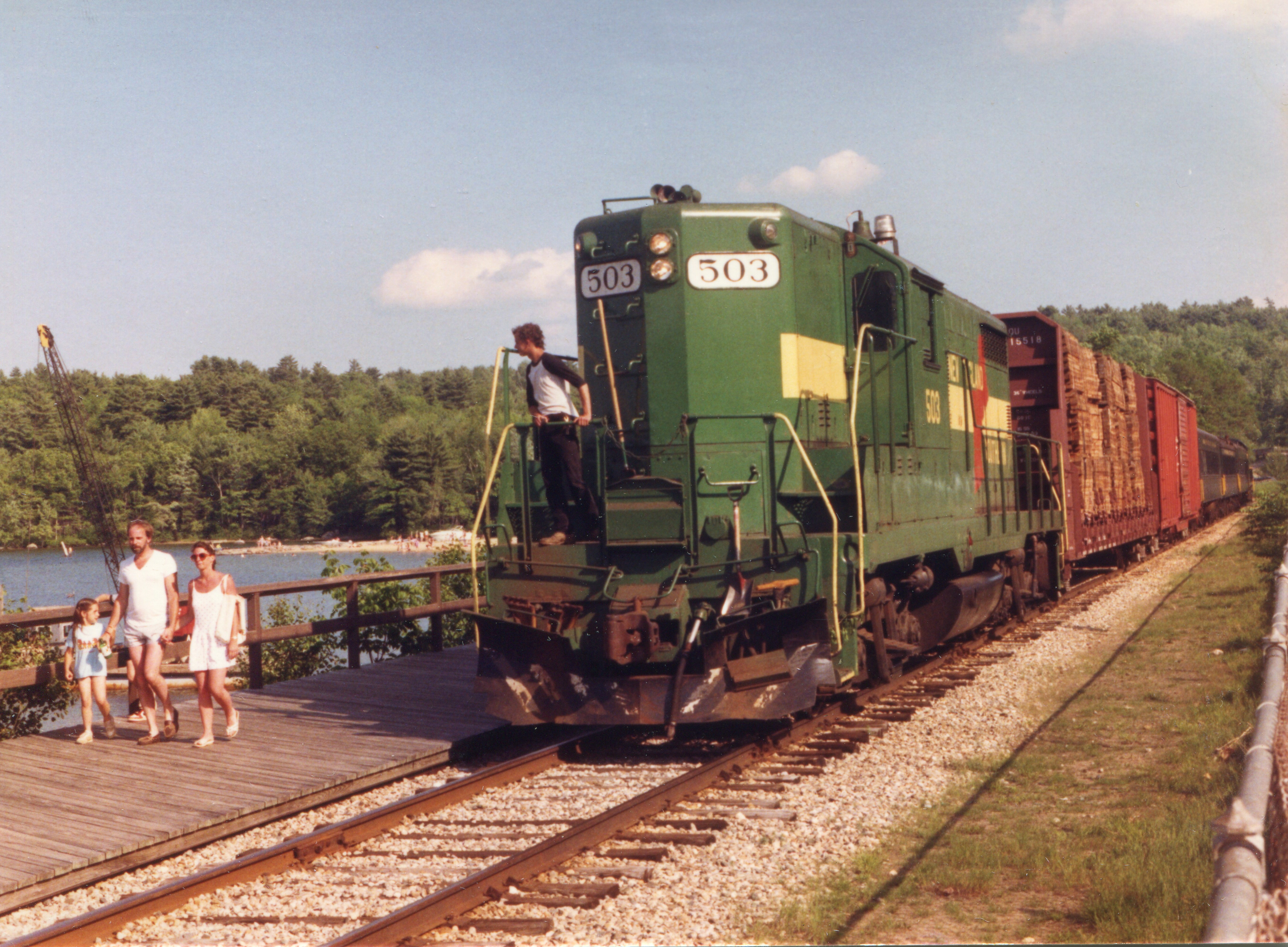
New England Southern Railroad #503 heads north through Weirs Beach in 1987 with freight bound for Rochester Shoe Tree in Ashland. Alan Thomas photo, Rick Kfoury collection.

In 1985 the railroad purchased its first two non-leased locomotives, an EMD GP18, #503, and an EMD GP7, #302, from the bankrupt Chicago, Rock Island and Pacific Railroad. The locomotives were painted in a green and yellow scheme and went to work immediately. 302 was originally slated to work on the B&M trackage near Worcester with access to Gardner, but that deal fell through when the Providence & Worcester Railroad objected. Access to trackage between Manchester and Boscawen had bolstered the railroad's yearly carloads from 250 to nearly 2,750, much of which was due to Blue Seal Feeds at Bow Junction, and International Salt in Bow. In the late 1980s the railroad was also operating a Reload on former B&M branch in Chicopee Falls, Massachusetts for Georgia Pacific, and provided rail-plant maintenance and on-site switching at the SD Warren Paper Mill in Skowhegan, Maine. NEGS also performed various maintenance-of-way contracts around New England, in MA, ME, NH and VT. Less fortunate, was a proposed significant aggregate move from Columbia Falls-Centerville, Maine area, west to deep water near Bucksport, over the former Maine Central's Calais Branch of Maine DOT, which fell through. A 1988 bid on the ex-Grand Trunk line in Maine, New Hampshire and Vermont, went instead to the St. Lawrence & Atlantic Railroad.

In the summer of 1987, AT&T began laying fiber-optic cable along the Northern Railroad mainline from Concord to Lebanon, and the New England Southern was contracted to re-lay ballast along the right-of-way. Dearness had intended to run all the way to Lebanon, but at the time the Northern was not being used for regular freight service beyond Penacook, and years of poor track maintenance and neglect under B&M ownership meant that the New England Southern ballast trains could only venture a bit further than the Potter Place station in Andover. Still, these historic runs proved to be the final time any trains passed through the communities of Boscawen, Franklin, and Andover; the track was removed by owner Guilford shortly afterwards. Today, the track ends just north of the U.S. Route 4 overpass in Boscawen, near the Merrimack River and the Hannah Duston State Historic Site. The right of way north of that location has been transformed into the Northern Rail Trail.

Throughout the 1990s, the New England Southern continued to profit from multi-day-a-week service on the Manchester to Concord segment. Freight service on the White Mountain Branch had dried up except for one customer, 3M in eastern Tilton, and occasional equipment moves to the Hobo and Winnipesaukee Scenic Railroads. The last freight customer on the old Northern above Concord, Rivco in Penacook, received its last shipments in 1992. In 1989 the railroad had started a passenger operation, the Granite State Railroad, which ran until 1993. The railroad also began to run trains of privately owned cabooses between Northfield and Concord with more occasional cooperating runs with the Plymouth & Lincoln Railroad to Lincoln.

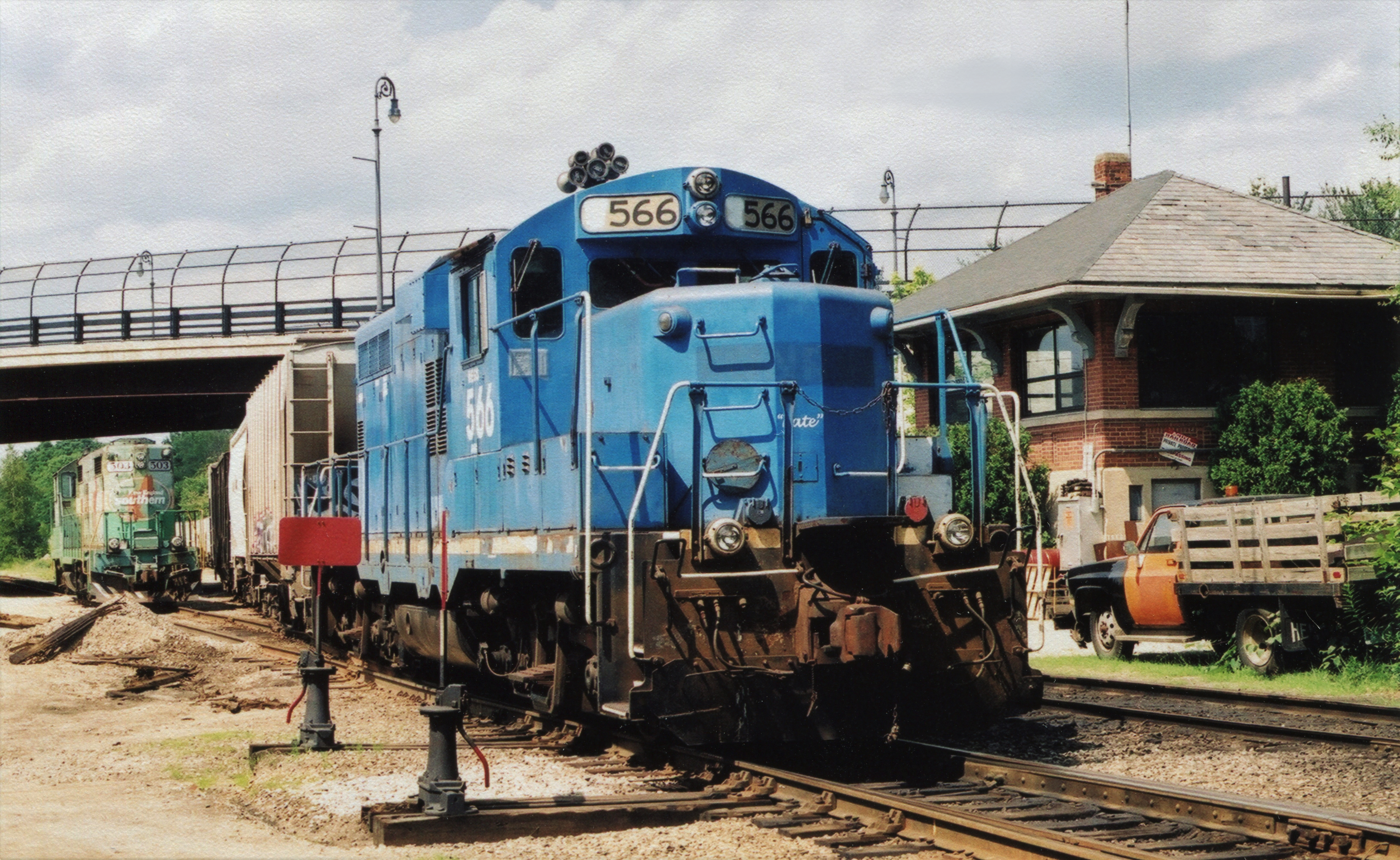
New England Southern 566 and 503 at the tower in Concord in 2004, the railroad's headquarters until their eviction by Pan Am in 2010. Alan Thomas photo, Rick Kfoury collection.

In 2002, the railroad began serving a new customer, Ciment Quebec, in Bow. This profitable growth business caught the eye of Guilford, which had been watching New England Southern build up business in the area. Guilford, which had inherited ownership of the tracks from the B&M in 1983, rebranded itself Pan Am Railways in 2006 and announced its intention to discontinue the New England Southern's lease, so that they might assume operations themselves. Pan Am filed with the Surface Transportation Board for adverse discontinuance of the lease in 2008, and despite a lengthy legal battle and the protests of every freight customer, the filing was approved on April 29, 2010, and ultimately, Pan Am assumed control of the Manchester to Boscawen trackage. Switching services then went from at least three, four times a week, to once, as result.

The New England Southern made its final run to Manchester on October 16, 2010, after 25 years of reliable service. Following that run, the railroad set up a new headquarters on an expanded yard trackage on state-owned property, off Exit 18 of I-93 in Canterbury. In an ironic twist of fate, the shortline had been more or less relegated to its original form, operating solely on the White Mountain Branch. Since 2010 the railroad has operated on an as-needed basis, serving the 3M plant and delivering the odd equipment move to the Hobo Railroad. Occasional special moves, including 2014 and 2018 contracts with the New Hampshire Army National Guard to ship military equipment to and from training exercises, have supplemented the railroad's income.

In February 2019, an unauthorized press release was published stating the railroad was going to be acquired by United Rail, a corporate conglomerate based out of Las Vegas. On July 31, 2019, NEGS ownership announced that the deal with United Rail had not been finalized, as was supposed to happen by June 30, and that operations were returning to pre-sale conditions. Then on May 10, 2020, it was reported that the Vermont Railway was to acquire New England Southern Railroad. In June 2020, the sale was finalized and VRS became immediate operator of NEGS. Its sole engine (2555) was patched with GMTX logos and renumbered to 1505.

== Operations ==
The New England Southern yard at Canterbury, NH. August 7, 2016. Rick Kfoury photo.

Currently, the New England Southern operates under Vermont Rail Systems and regularly only on the state-owned White Mountain Branch in central New Hampshire. The railroad's sole interchange point is with Pan Am Railways at Concord, from which loaded cars come inbound and empties depart.

== Locomotive roster ==
=== Active units ===
Number	Builder	Type	Build date	Status	Notes
1505	EMD	EMD SW1500	1970	Operational	Ex-Union Pacific unit built originally for the Southern Pacific in 1970. Formerly numbered as 2555.

=== Former units ===
Number	Builder	Type	Build date	Notes
1008	ALCO	ALCO S1	1949	Originally built for the Portland Terminal in 1949, 1008 was purchased by the State of New Hampshire in 1980 and was used by the North Stratford Railroad on the White Mountain branch until the New England Southern assumed operations in 1981. From 1985 1008 was used almost exclusively on the original Winnipesaukee Railroad operation, which the New England Southern started. In 1987 the locomotive was transferred to the Hobo Railroad, where it was assigned to their Winnipesaukee Scenic Railroad. The locomotive has been out of service since 2014 following a mechanical issue.
2	General Electric	GE 44-Ton Switcher	-	Originally built for the US Army Railroad, this switcher was sold to the State of NH in 1976 and was used by the Wolfeboro, Goodwin and North Stratford Railroads before New England Southern. The locomotive ran freight service until 1985, when it too was transferred to the Winnipesaukee Railroad. Sold to the Hobo Railroad in 1992, the engine has been out of service since the late 1990s.
503	Electro-Motive Diesel	EMD GP18	1960	Originally built for the Chicago, Rock Island and Pacific Railroad as 1341, the locomotive was sold to New England Southern in 1985. In 2007 it was sold to the New Hampshire Northcoast Railroad, which repainted it and renumbered it 1801.
302	Electro-Motive Diesel	EMD GP7	1950	Originally built for the Chicago, Rock Island and Pacific Railroad as 438, the locomotive was sold to New England Southern in 1985. In 1998 it was sold to the Hobo Railroad, which converted it into a low-nose locomotive and repainted it. It serves as a backup unit for the Winnipesaukee Scenic Railroad and is also the backup for the New England Southern on the occasion that 2555 has a mechanical issue.
566	Electro-Motive Diesel	EMD GP10	1955	Originally built in 1955 as New York Central GP9 5911, the unit later became Penn Central / Conrail 7311. It was rebuilt into a GP10 for Conrail at the Paducah Shops in 1978 and was sold to New England Southern in December 1997. In 2007 it was sold to the Belvidere & Delaware Railroad Co., which renumbered it 1856 and repainted it.
20	Electro-Motive Diesel	EMD SW9	-	Originally ran for Conrail, 20 was purchased from the Quincy Bay Terminal (QBT) in 2003 and was sold to PSNH in 2007. It is currently the switcher at the Merrimack Station coal plant in Bow.
2370	Electro-Motive Diesel	EMD GP39-2	1984	Originally built for the Missouri-Kansas-Texas Railroad in 1984 as #371, she later became Union Pacific #2370. She was sold to the New England Southern in 2004 and ran until she was sold to 2011 to the Ann Arbor Railroad. In 2011, 2370 was seriously damaged in a derailment in E. Concord, where she tumbled down an embankment onto her side due to ice build-up on rails caused by illegal snowmobile activity. The unit was repaired at the Hobo Railroad shops in Lincoln and later sold to the Michigan Ann Arbor Railroad (AA), and renumbered 3927. The Ann Arbor is now owned by WATCO.

== Passenger train service ==
New England Southern operated several tourist train passenger service over its White Mountain Branch. These included:

- Winnipesaukee Railroad — Started by New England Southern in 1985, NEGS pulled out shortly afterwards. The railroad was operated independently by Paul Cronin until 1992 when it lost its DOT rights, then picked up by the Clark family's Plymouth & Lincoln Railroad and became the Winnipesaukee Scenic Railroad of today.
- Granite State Railroad — Operated over the White Mountain Branch as tourist trains from 1989 until 1993 between Concord and Tilton using two leased coaches.
- Caboose Train — Operated jointly with the caboose owners of the Merrimack Valley Railroad in Northfield. This train included three private passenger cars and, at differing times, 15-18 cabooses. The Merrimack Valley Railroad contracted with NEGS to pull the consist between Tilton and Concord. Substantial increases in liability insurance (required by the State of New Hampshire) resulted in the end of caboose train service in 2012, after about 15 years of annual excursions.
