= Suncook Valley Railroad =

Railroad in New Hampshire, United States

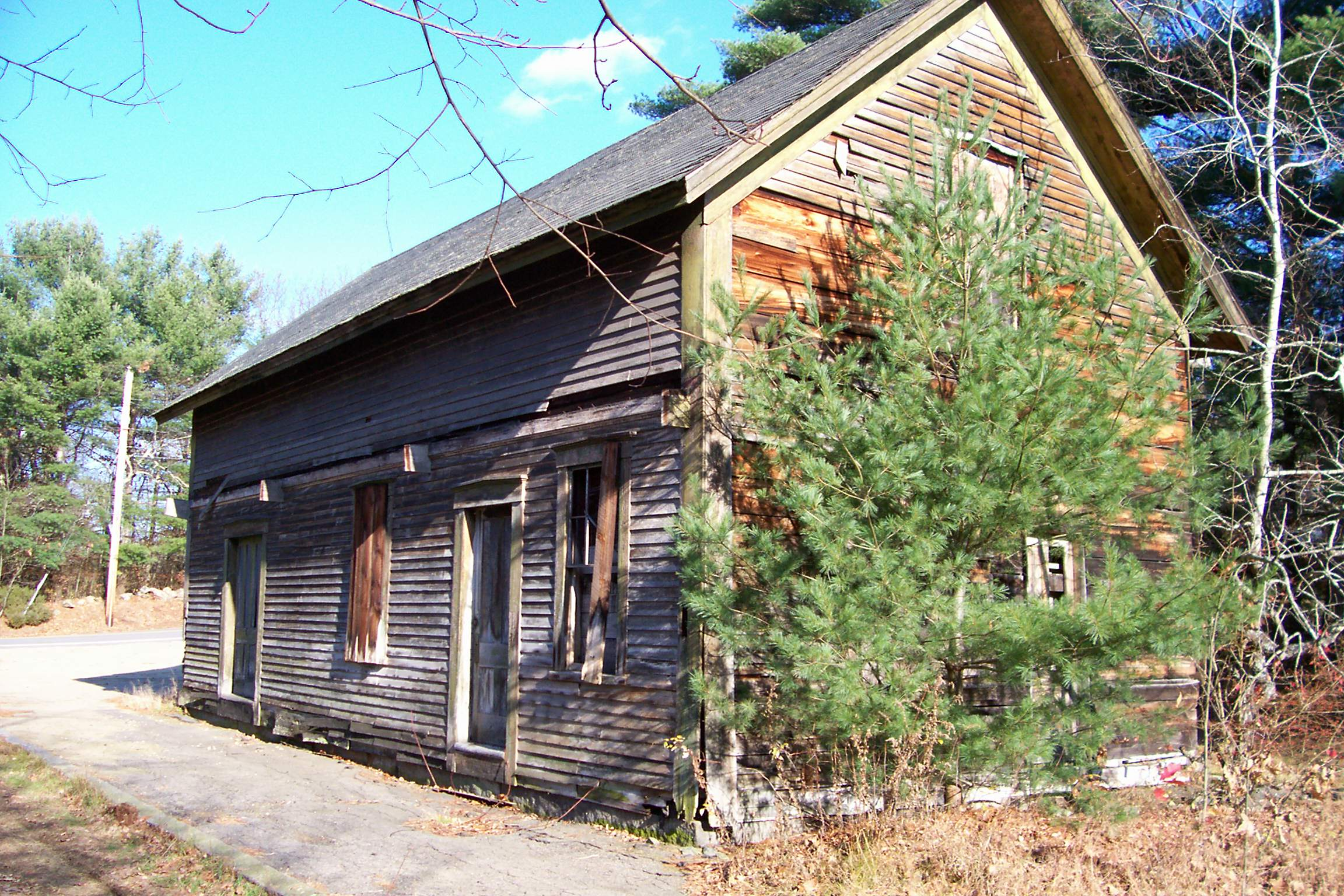
- The former Short Falls station in November 2006

Overview
- Headquarters: Pittsfield, New Hampshire
- Reporting mark: SV
- Locale: New Hampshire, United States
- Dates of operation: 1869–1952

Technical
- Track gauge: 4 ft 8 1/2 in (1,435 mm) standard gauge

The Suncook Valley Railroad was a short-line railroad in the United States, originating in Suncook, New Hampshire, and terminating in Barnstead, New Hampshire. After a long period of operation by lessees, it was operated as an independent railroad from September 28, 1924, until it was abandoned, with the last train operating December 20, 1952. It served the Suncook River valley region in central New Hampshire, stopping in key communities such as Allenstown, Epsom, Pittsfield, and Barnstead.

== History ==
The route of the fabled Blueberry Express was first suggested in January 1849, when a charter was granted by the state of New Hampshire to John Berry to build a railroad from east of Concord into the Suncook Valley to Pittsfield. A second charter was granted in July of that same year for a second investment group to extend the rails from Pittsfield to connect with the Dover and Winnipesogee Railroad (modern spelling Winnipesaukee) at an undetermined point near the village of Alton Bay. The charters lapsed into expiration due to disputes over an easement and a lack of financial backing. The looming Civil War also halted plans for the railroad.

In 1863, a second pair of charters were granted by the New Hampshire courts for the construction of the Suncook Valley road, and what became known as the Suncook Valley Extension Railroad-the line to be constructed from Pittsfield to Alton. Ground was broken April 26, 1869, the company was leased to the Concord Railroad November 11, 1869, and the first Suncook-Pittsfield round trip took place on December 6 of that year.

The Suncook Valley Extension Railroad was subsequently constructed by the Concord RR in 1889, and was wholly owned by that line. It was completed only as far as Center Barnstead; the connection to Alton never materialized.

The Concord RR was merged with the Boston, Concord, & Montreal effective January 1, 1890, to form the Concord and Montreal Railroad. The Suncook Valley lease was thus transferred to the new operation. Similarly, the C&M was leased by the Boston and Maine Railroad effective June 29, 1895, with the Suncook Valley control changing in the same manner.

On January 1, 1912, the original lease expired, but was extended until January 1, 1914, and again until January 1, 1916. When renewed upon the last contract's termination, the B&M would include terms providing for a shrewd, 60-day notice exit clause, which would be further reduced to 30 days in 1921. As the new decade proceeded, the B&M sought to shed the expense of running into the Suncook Valley region and petitioned for abandonment of its operation of the line on July 26, 1924. Notice of termination of the lease was given to Suncook Valley officers, and the last B&M train would leave Center Barnstead for Suncook on morning of September 28, 1924.

== Independent operation ==
As the end of B&M operation loomed, preparations were made to begin operating the line in order to continue service. The Suncook agent, B&M employee C.J. McDonough was hired on as the general manager of the SV, whilst retaining his capacity with the B&M. Arrangements were made with the B&M to lease a locomotive and passenger equipment, and New Hampshire's first independent shortline began operating at noon on September 28, 1924.

Frank P. Fosgate would replace Mr. McDonough as General Manager effective January 27, 1925. With an after-the-fact approval, the ICC would also grant permission for SV operation of the Suncook Valley Extension RR in March 1925, with the B&M willfully surrendering its ownership of the extension to the SV.

From 1924 until June 6, 1936, the Suncook Valley would run two round trips from its terminus at Center Barnstead to Suncook and return. The first and last run of each day were operated as passenger trains; the two midday trips were operated as mixed train service- passenger and freight.

Mr. Fosgate died in November 1932, and would be succeeded by George S. Fowler. Throughout the early 1930s, the B&M considered how best to further reduce unprofitable branch lines. Based on a stated claim regarding the poor condition of some wooden bridges at the south end of the Suncook Loop at Hooksett, rail passenger service was discontinued on the Loop in January, 1935, and freight service was pared back further. Consequently, after SV management successfully completed negotiations to lease the Loop, Suncook Valley trains began operation into Concord, NH, on June 8, 1936.

Conductor Edmund J. Stapleton became General Manager in 1943. During World War II, the SV abandoned service on the remaining stub from Suncook to Hooksett, when the last remaining customer on that track relocated to Suncook Village. In March 1947, the railroad abandoned the extension trackage north of Pittsfield. In 1950, after a 1949 embargo crisis, the shortline would purchase outright the Suncook Loop all the way to the Merrimack River crossing at Bow Jct. In 1951, the line would complete a tie replacement program resulting in one out of eight ties being replaced.

Near the end of 1952, shortline operator Samuel Pinsly approached the railroad's officers with an offer to purchase the line. Perennially strapped for cash, but offered a promise to continue operations, the local stock holders accepted, and Pinsly took control in October. One of the first actions by the new management was to file a petition for abandonment. The railroad hauled mail via the Pittsfield & Concord RPO until the last day, despite concerns of a pending loss of the mail contract which had gone on for several years. The last inbound train moved up to Pittsfield on December 15, 1952, and on the 20th, one last trip to Concord was made. Pinsly would recoup his purchase price in the value of the railroad's nearly new locomotive and the scrap value in the rails and steel bridges. By the spring of 1953, the iron had been pulled.

== Excursions ==
During the 1930s, the Suncook Valley hosted a series of railfan excursions, bringing in an unusual influx of rented equipment for the day, in addition to some much needed extra revenue. The first was hosted on November 4, 1934, by the National Association of Railway Enthusiasts, it being only their second excursion after a trip on the Hoosac Tunnel and Wilmington Railroad just earlier that year. B&M Hike-and-Bike excursions were held on October 20, 1935, and Nov 11, 1936. The NARE would return for another trip on October 10, 1937.

== Equipment ==
From the beginning of independent operation, the shortline leased a locomotive and passenger cars from the B&M. However, on March 21, 1927, the Baldwin Locomotive Works shipped the railroad a brand new Model 8-30-D, light 2-6-0 steam locomotive. Numbered #1, it would serve the railroad continuously until April 1949. On April 22 of that year, SV #2, an ex-Army General Electric 43-ton diesel switcher built in 1940, arrived on the property. This replacement was found to be rather inadequate for the railroad's needs, and they went direct to GE for a new locomotive, a 44-tonner, in July 1951. #3 would serve until the last day of operation, going on to work successive jobs on other Pinsly shortlines.

The Suncook Valley acquired RPO/baggage/passenger combination car #1 and coach #2, both second hand equipment from the B&M, shortly after independent operations. In Aug 1930, the line began to run their newly acquired combine #3 after it had been rebuilt with passenger seating added to their specifications by the B&M Concord Shops from their #2393, a former RPO/baggage combine. During the last year of operations, the B&M would lease to the SV RPO/baggage combine #2373 due to #3 being removed from service due to a broken truck frame.

The Suncook Valley had little need for the expense of an extensive freight car fleet with an ample supply of equipment available from the B&M yard at Concord. However, they would acquire two 36' truss-rod underframe box cars from the B&M shortly after 1924 for use in local, LCL, and eventually in 1930, milk service online.

The line would own three former B&M snow plows over the years, with #500 and #501 arriving early during independent operations, and unnumbered "502" coming along in 1946.

After some years of disuse, much of the rolling stock would be damaged in a June 24, 1937 engine house fire. The two remaining pieces, Combine #3 and Plow "502" would be burned several years after abandonment. Engine #1 had been scrapped in 1950, #2 went on to be used by a construction aggregate firm, and after extensive service on a series of Pinsly shortlines, #3 would wind up in Canada where it was scrapped around 1995.

== Traffic ==
The textile and shoe industry at Pittsfield would provide much of the impetus for the line's creation in 1869. Inbound fuel products, lumber, feed, and general freight, and outbound products including stone and aggregate, and manufactured wood products, including box shooks and furniture, would supplant those industries. However, with the textile industry declining during the Depression, and the short distance to the far larger commercial centers of Concord and Manchester, by WWII, the railroad's traffic became largely constrained to inbound carload freight: coal, lumber, and feed for the Valley's extensive poultry industry.

Passenger and milk traffic declined early, a result of the shorter distances and quicker transit times offered by motor vehicles and improved roads.

== Legacy ==
The SV was notable for reasons such as the use of steam power well after World War II (until 1949), its daunting switchback gaining access to the route in Suncook village, its first-of-a-kind independent status, and the never-say-die frugality that defined life in rural New Hampshire.

== Literature ==
- Topper Hamblett: The Suncook Valley Railroad, 1867-68. Suncook Valley Sun, April 17, 1974.
- John C. Hutchins: The Blueberry Express - A History of the Suncook Valley Railroad. Flying Yankee Enterprises. ISBN 0961557400
- David K. Johnson: Twice Daily Except Sunday. New Hampshire Profiles, April, 1952.
- John W. Merrill: Suncook Valley Railroad. The Enthusiast, January 1935.
- William S. Young: Seven Short-Lines, Their Lives and Times. 1961.
