= Pemigewasset Valley Railroad =

Overview
- Locale: Grafton County, New Hampshire
- Dates of operation: March 1–April 1, 1883
- Successor: Boston, Concord and Montreal Railroad

Technical
- Track gauge: 4 ft 8 1/2 in (1,435 mm) standard gauge
- Length: 21 miles (34 km)

The Pemigewasset Valley Railroad was a railroad connecting Plymouth to North Woodstock, New Hampshire, United States. Funded by the Boston, Concord and Montreal Railroad, it was only independent for one month after construction before being permanently "leased" by the BC&M.
