= Portsmouth and Concord Railroad =

Map

The Portsmouth and Concord Railroad (later the Concord and Portsmouth Railroad) was an American railroad in New Hampshire that existed under various names from 1845 to 1945.

== History and construction ==
By 1845, the state of New Hampshire had three north-south routes, all starting in Massachusetts and leading, respectively, to the capital of Concord, through southeastern New Hampshire to Maine by way of Dover, and along the coast via Portsmouth to Maine. However, a large gap existed between the Boston-Concord line and the Boston & Maine line through Dover. In response, two railway companies were founded in July 1845: the Portsmouth, New Market and Concord Railroad, and the Portsmouth, New Market and Exeter Railroad. Both were given the concession to construct and operate a rail line from Portsmouth to a point on the Concord Railroad between Manchester and Concord called Bow Junction. The companies merged on December 23, 1845, forming the Portsmouth and Concord Railroad. On July 10, 1846, the railroad was granted a license for a branch line from Hooksett to Suncook, then on June 23, 1848, a license for a branch line from Manchester to Candia.

The construction of the mainline from Portsmouth to Bow Junction began in Portsmouth in the summer of 1847. In August 1852, the approximately 50-mile (80 km) mainline was completed. The two branch lines were not initially built.

== Further development ==
The route fell short of revenue expectations, and in 1855 declared bankruptcy. On May 1, 1855, the company took out a mortgage on their track, whereupon ownership passed to the creditors of the railway. On July 14, a new company named the Concord and Portsmouth Railroad was founded; and on September 1, the new company took over the railway.

However, the financial situation did not significantly improve, and on September 11, 1858, the financially strong Concord Railroad leased the Concord and Portsmouth Railroad company for five years, then on January 1, 1862, extended the lease to 99 years. This railroad company abandoned the Candia-to-Suncook section, and instead the two already-licensed branch lines were built. The closure coincided with the opening of the route to Manchester, the rest of the feeder route from Bow Junction to Suncook, and the license for the branch line to Hooksett.

The Concord Railroad was merged with other companies to form the Concord and Montreal Railroad on September 19, 1889, and the lease contract with the Concord & Portsmouth was transferred to this new company. On June 29, 1895, management of the route went to the Boston & Maine, having been leased to the Concord & Montreal in the meantime. The Boston & Maine bought a majority stake in the company in 1940 and achieved complete ownership four years later. In 1945, the Concord & Portsmouth dissolved. In 1982, the track between Rockingham Junction and East Manchester closed and is now owned by the state of New Hampshire and managed as a recreational trail. The Manchester to East Manchester segment was operated as an industrial spur and saw rail service until 1994. It was abandoned in 1995. The remaining section from Rockingham Junction to Portsmouth is now operated by Pan Am Railways.
