= Springfield Terminal Railway (Vermont) =

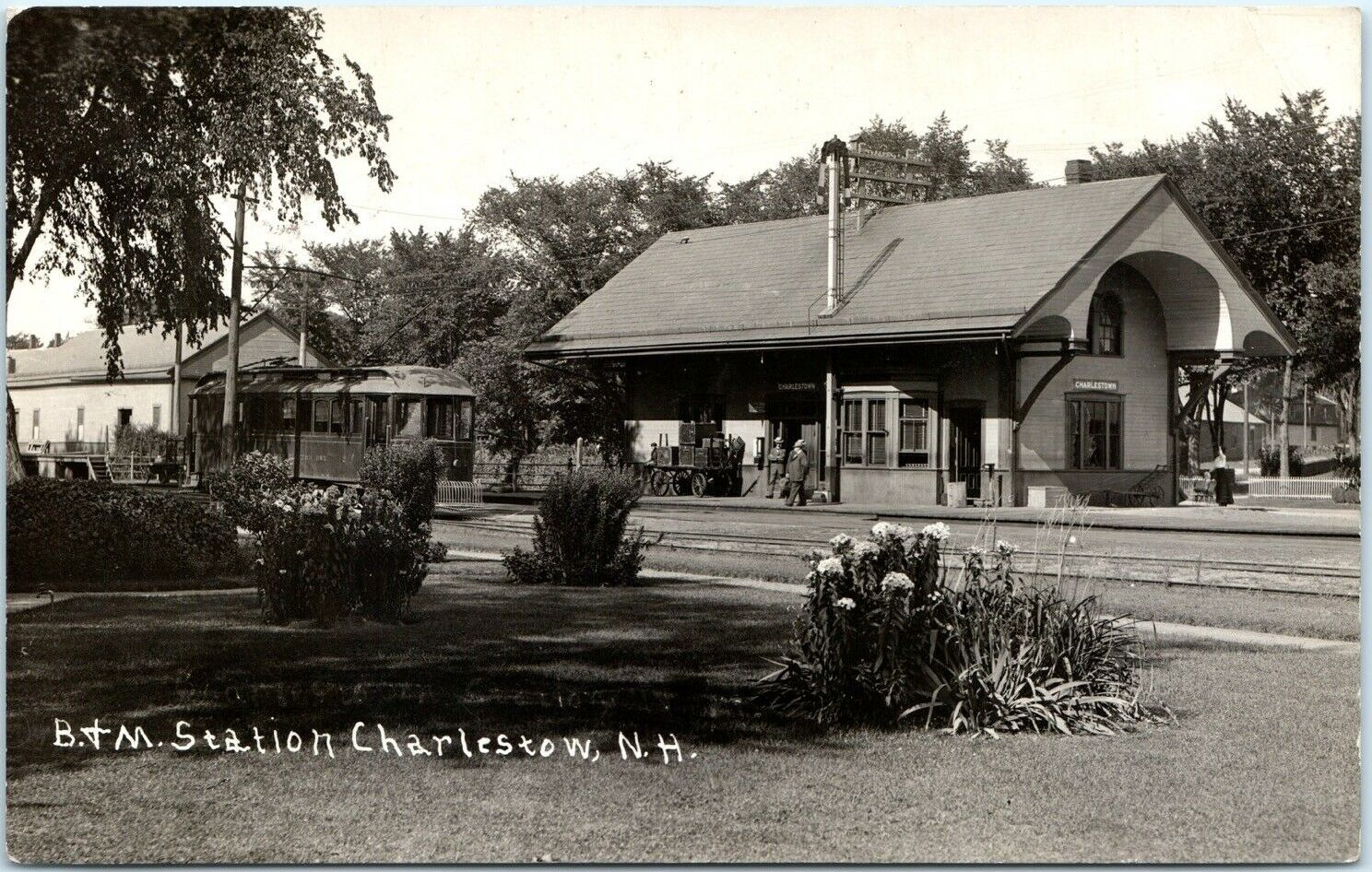
Springfield Terminal train at Charlestown station. (1913)

The Springfield Electric Railway, affectionately referred to as the Toonerville Trolley, was an electric trolley system that operated in the town of Springfield, Vermont. The railway, which later became the Springfield Terminal Railway, was initially funded by the town in 1896 with the aim of establishing connections to the railroads passing through Charlestown, New Hampshire, across the Connecticut River. Eventually, the Boston and Maine Railroad gained control of the railway. While the trolley service ceased operations in 1947, making it the longest-running trolley in the state at that time, freight usage of the tracks ended in 1984. The Springfield Terminal name continues to exist as a subsidiary of Pan Am Railways which is now owned by CSX.

The river's falls in downtown Springfield played a significant role in the area's mill boom during the 19th century and attracted businesses to relocate. Notably, the Jones & Lamson Machine Co. emerged from this era and gained worldwide recognition as a toolmaker. This led to the establishment of Precision Valley, a hub of technological innovation in the early 20th century.

== Timeline ==
November 28, 1894: The Springfield Electric Railway Company is established in the State of Vermont.

November 1894: The Springfield Electric Railway Company of New Hampshire leases its assets to the Springfield Electric Railway Company.

January 1922: The Springfield Electric Railway Company undergoes reorganization and becomes the Springfield Terminal Railway Company.

1932: The Boston and Maine Railroad purchases the entire capital stock of the Springfield Terminal Railway Company between 1922 and 1932, making it a fully owned subsidiary.

March 15, 1951: The Springfield Electric Railway Company dissolves.

June 30, 1983: Guilford Transportation Industries, Inc. acquires both the Boston and Maine Corporation and its wholly owned subsidiary, the Springfield Terminal Railway Company.

1987: Guilford Transportation Industries, Inc. leases its Maine Central Railroad Company and Portland Terminal Company properties to the Springfield Terminal Railway Company.

September 11, 1987: Guilford Transportation Industries, Inc. leases its Boston and Maine Corporation property to the Springfield Terminal Railway Company.

May 1, 2009: Pan Am Southern, LLC acquires the Boston and Maine Corporation property from points just east of Ayer, Massachusetts to the west, designating the Springfield Terminal Railway Company as the operator.

== Preservation ==
=== Toonerville Rail-Trail (Springfield Greenway) ===
In 1999, the Toonerville Rail-Trail, also known as the Springfield Greenway, was opened to the public. Spanning 3.2 miles, the paved multipurpose trail primarily follows the course of the Black River in eastern Springfield until it reaches the border with New Hampshire across the Connecticut River. The trail serves as a recreational pathway, preserving the legacy of the Toonerville Trolley and the community's connection to it. The trailhead is located approximately a mile east of downtown Springfield on SR 11/Clinton Street, and ample parking is available in a shared field utilized by the Springfield Farmers Market during Saturdays from June to early October.

Future plans for the trail include an extension of approximately 0.7 mile northward to Bridge Street, aiming to enhance accessibility to downtown Springfield.

=== Preserved rolling stock ===
Car number 10 and 16 are preserved at the Connecticut Trolley Museum in East Windsor, Connecticut.

Preserved Rolling Stock of the Springfield Terminal Railway.

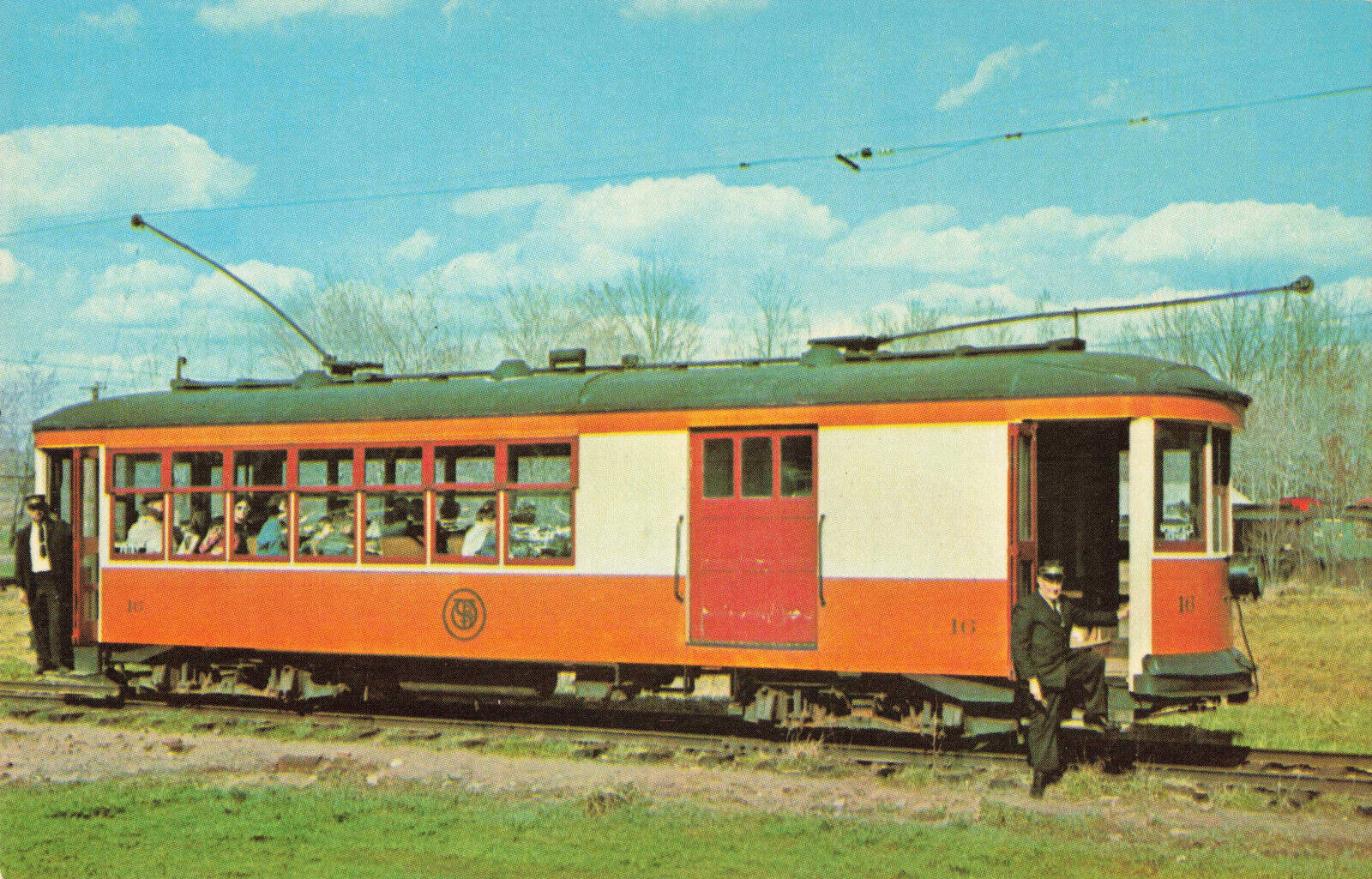
Springfield Terminal 16 at the Connecticut Trolley Museum.

== See also ==
- Manchester Street Railway another nearby defunct electric interurban with several operational cars preserved at the Seashore Trolley Museum.
- Vermonter (train)
