= Monadnock Railroad =

Map

The Monadnock Railroad was one of many extension line railroads built to help expand the Fitchburg Railroad/Vermont and Massachusetts Railroad into New Hampshire. This line was to serve the New Hampshire towns on the eastern side of Mount Monadnock, mainly Jaffrey and Peterborough.

It took quite a bit of time for the line to get going after the railroad was chartered in 1848. It began in Winchendon, Massachusetts, where the line ran off the Cheshire Railroad at a junction with the Ware River Railroad and the Boston, Barre and Gardner Railroad, but construction did not begin until 1870, some 22 years later.

The Monadnock finally opened from Winchendon to Jaffrey, New Hampshire, in December 1870 and then to Peterborough by late spring 1871, from which the Peterborough and Hillsborough Railroad could take traffic further north to Concord.

The Boston, Barre and Gardner Railroad, running south from Winchendon, leased the Monadnock in 1874 in order to have a line to Concord. In 1880, the BB&GRR fell on hard times and transferred the lease to the Cheshire Railroad in order to keep it out of the hands of the Boston and Albany Railroad which had taken over the Ware River in 1873 and wanted to have access to the Monadnock Region. The Monadnock became part of the Fitchburg, along with the entire Cheshire, in 1890 and then to the Boston and Maine Railroad in 1900.

As a line of the Boston and Maine Railroad (B&M), the Monadnock served as part of a long through route between Worcester, Massachusetts, and Concord under the name of the Worcester and Hillsboro (sometimes Worcester and Contoocook) branch.

Through service ended on the line after the floods caused by the 1938 Hurricane, but local passenger trains continued to run until 1953. The line survived intact until 1972 when the B&M abandoned the line between Jaffrey and Peterborough. The remainder of the line continued until 1984 when Guilford abandoned it.
