= Concord and Claremont Railroad =

American railroad company

Claremont Concord

Overview
- Headquarters: Claremont, New Hampshire
- Reporting mark: CCRR
- Locale: New Hampshire
- Dates of operation: June 24, 1848–1875
- Successor: Boston & Maine Railroad

Technical
- Track gauge: 4 ft 8 1/2 in (1,435 mm) standard gauge

The Concord and Claremont Railroad was an American railroad company during the mid-nineteenth century in New Hampshire spanning from Concord to Claremont.

== History ==
Chartered on June 24, 1848, the Concord and Claremont Railroad was established and construction had begun on November 19, 1848. Approximately ten months later, on September 21, the railroad was opened from Concord to Warner.

The very first train to travel the line left Warner and had approximately 500 passengers aboard the 9 passenger coaches. On the return trip from Concord, the train carried about 800 passengers on the 18 passenger coaches, which required a second locomotive pushing from the rear. The original railroad line was only 18 miles (29 km) long, but it was soon extended through Bradford, adding 9 miles (14 km) to the line.

In 1852, the railroad filed for bankruptcy; it was merged in 1853 with the New Hampshire Central Railroad, forming what was known as the Merrimac and Connecticut Rivers Railroad Company. In 1874, the Sugar River Railroad, which built and ran its rail line from Newport to Claremont, merged with the Contoocook Valley Railroad and again created the Concord and Claremont Railroad, under the control of the Northern Railroad.

In 1887, the Boston and Maine Railroad absorbed the Concord and Claremont, and the line was now known as the Claremont Branch of the Boston & Maine.

== Independent shortline ==
The Claremont and Concord Railway was established in 1954 when shortline railroad operator Samuel Pinsly purchased 55 miles (89 km) of track between Claremont Junction and Concord from the Boston and Maine Railroad. A succession of abandonments between 1960 and 1977 cut the line back to just four miles (6 km) between Claremont and Claremont Junction.

Passenger rail on the line had a surprising rebirth for eight weeks in the summer of 1961. Between July 22 and September 17, the tracks between Bradford and Sunapee were used by F. Nelson Blount and his Monadnock, Steamtown & Northern Railroad, a tourist excursion railroad. Blount approached Pinsly when his planned operations on the Boston & Maine's Cheshire Branch did not materialize quickly enough for the 1961 season. The operation utilized a former Canadian National Railway 4-6-4T steam locomotive, #47, and several former Boston & Maine wooden coaches. The steam operation came to an early end on August 25 when the locomotive was removed from service on account of missing maintenance paperwork, which had been disposed of by the Canadian National when they retired #47 in 1958. A diesel replacement was used for an additional seven days, but was not popular. This was the last regularly scheduled passenger service on the Claremont Branch.

In 1988, the line was sold to a local lumber dealer that renamed the operation Claremont-Concord Railroad. In 2015 the railroad was acquired by Genesee and Wyoming Industries and integrated into its New England Central Railroad.

== Abandonments ==
Difficult economic times and the advancement of the automobile forced many railroads to close rail lines. The Boston & Maine Railroad was to sell off the rights to many of the lines and rights of way it held, including the Claremont Branch, sold to an independent operator in 1954, this time as the Claremont and Concord Railway. Once this had taken place, the Claremont and Concord's abandonments took place from east to west:

- 1960: 9 miles, W. Concord - west to Contoocook
- 1961: 17.6 miles, Contoocook - west to Bradford
- 1964: 16+ miles, Bradford - northwest to Newport
- 1977: 11 miles, Newport - west to Claremont
- 1988: 1.5 miles within Claremont
- 1988: 3 mile section - Electric Claremont Railway (opened in 1903)
- 2008: 1 mile section - Concord to West Concord (This section was not sold to Sam Pinsly; it was served by the Boston & Maine as far as Swenson Granite into the 1980s. A few hundred yards was used by New England Southern Railroad for car storage in the 2000s).

== Present uses ==
The Claremont Concord Railroad now operates 2 miles (3 km) between Claremont Junction on the main line to Claremont as a subsidiary of New England Central Railroad, itself a subsidiary of Genesee & Wyoming Industries.

9 miles (14 km) of the line between Claremont and Newport is now the Sugar River Recreational Rail Trail, owned and managed by the New Hampshire Division of Parks and Recreation.

The Concord-Lake Sunapee Rail Trail is currently under construction along portions of the rail line between Concord and Newbury.
