= Wolfeboro Railroad =

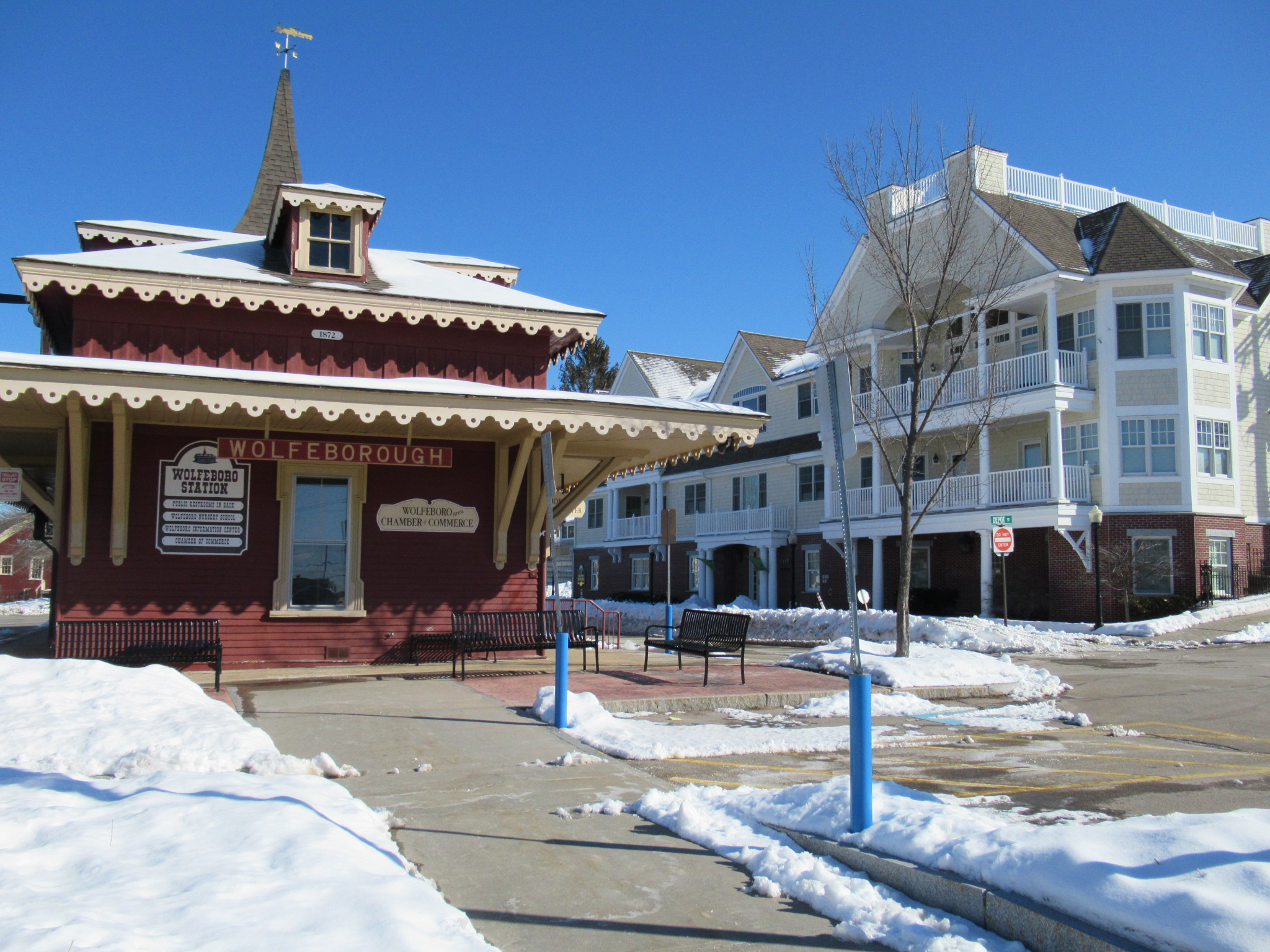
- The former Wolfeboro station in 2019

Overview
- Status: Defunct
- Locale: New Hampshire
- Termini: Sanbornville; Wolfeboro

Service
- Operator(s): Wolfeborough Railroad Co. (1870-1872); Eastern Railroad (1872-1884); Boston and Maine Railroad (1884-1960s); Wolfeboro Railroad Co. (1972-1978); Wolfeboro Steam Railroad Co. (1980-1985)

History
- Opened: 1870
- Closed: 1985

Technical
- Line length: 12 mi (19 km)
- Character: shortline railroad (1870-1936) heritage railway (1972-1985)
- Track gauge: 1,435 mm (4 ft 8 1/2 in) standard gauge

The Wolfeboro Railroad or Wolfeborough Railroad (later the Wolfeboro Branch of the Boston and Maine Railroad) is a former short line that provided service to the summer resort town of Wolfeboro, New Hampshire (formerly spelled "Wolfeborough") on Lake Winnipesaukee.

== History ==
Map

=== Construction ===
Wolfeborough Railroad Company was founded on July 1, 1868, and it built a 12-mile-long (19 km) standard gauge short line from the Portsmouth, Great Falls and Conway Railroad's tracks in Sanbornville, New Hampshire (formerly known as Wolfeborough Junction) to Wolfeboro.

Construction on the line began in November 1871, and the line was open for traffic on August 19, 1872. On January 6, 1872, the Eastern Railroad leased the Wolfeboro Railroad for a period of 68 years.

=== B&M era ===
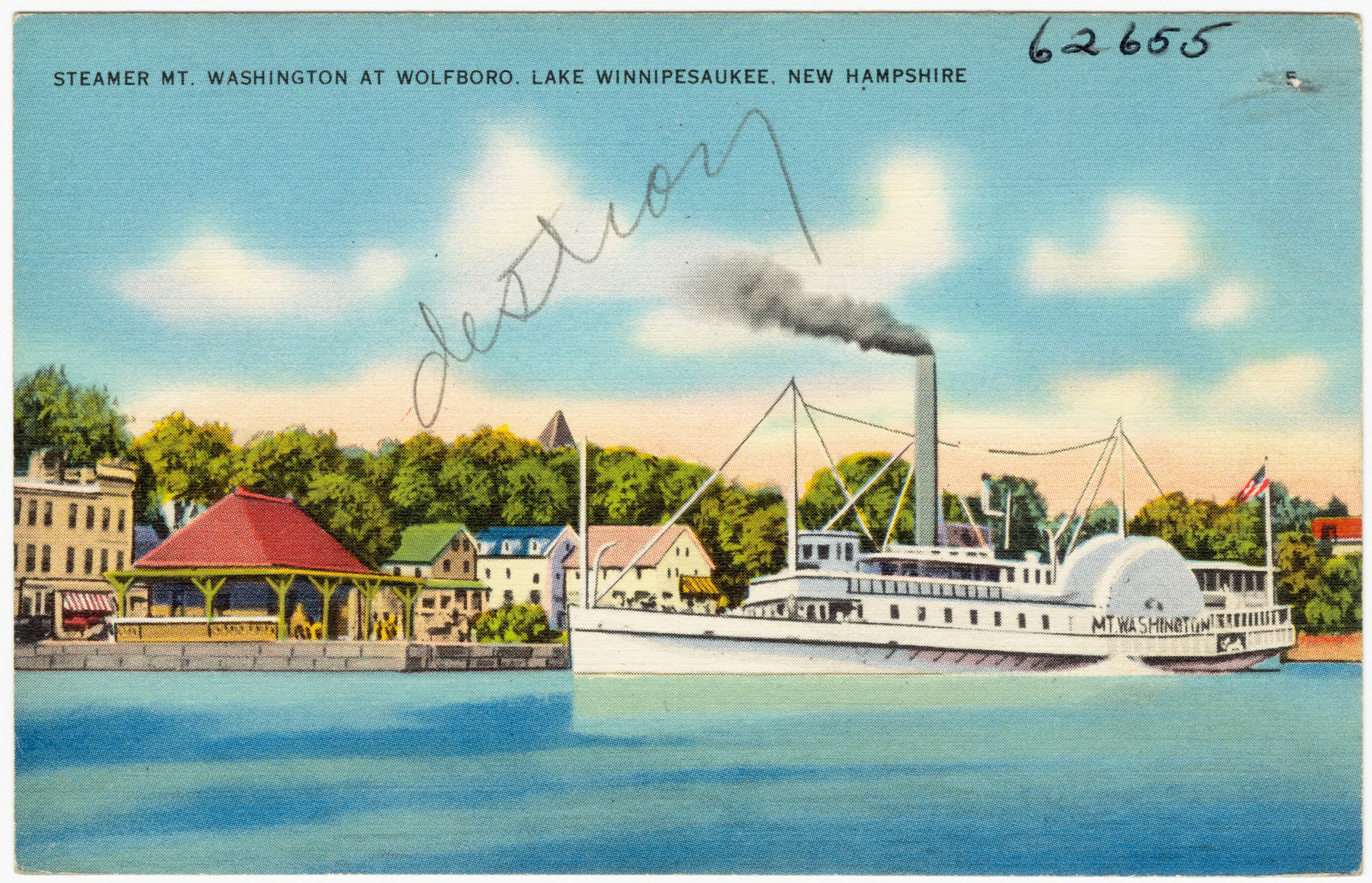
Steamboat Mt. Washington pulling alongside Wolfeboro's lakeshore railroad station, early 20th century

In 1884, the Boston & Maine took over operations on the Eastern, including the Wolfeboro Railroad. The tracks in Wolfeboro were extended across Main Street to a dock on the shore of Lake Winnipesaukee for easy connections to lake steamboats, with a waiting room on the first floor of a factory. On Christmas Eve, 1899, the building burned down, and in 1900, the B&M built a new Lake Station.

On June 30, 1892, the Wolfeboro Railroad was acquired by the Boston & Maine as part of its purchase of the Eastern Railroad, and it continued operating the line as the Wolfeboro Branch. Also in 1892, the first post office for Wolfeboro Falls opened in the B&M station there. By 1903, the B&M had headquartered its Eastern Division in Sanbornville, running a large maintenance facility there. On April 8, 1911, the Sanbornville shops were destroyed in a fire. The B&M did not rebuild the facilities, sending trains instead to Dover for repairs.

=== Decline ===
In 1927, the B&M began using railcars on the line. In 1935, the lakefront station was closed, and on May 16, 1936, the B&M stopped running trains for passengers only, although it continued running mixed passenger and freight trains until about 1950. By the 1960s, only freight trains were running on the track.

Once freight service became unprofitable, the B&M decided to close the line. However, throughout the 1970s and 1980s, several companies maintained the line as a heritage railway. On December 19, 1972, a new company called the Wolfeboro Rail Road Company (WRR) was founded and took over the line, running both freight trains and a tourist steam train and reopening the lakeshore station. On January 28, 1976, the WRR also began operation on a section of railroad owned by the State of NH, under an operating contract, on the opposite side of the lake, between Concord and Lincoln. However, in November 1977, facing financial trouble, the contract for operations on the Concord to Lincoln line was cancelled, and a new contract was awarded to the Goodwin Railroad.

In 1979, the Wolfeboro Steam Railroad Corporation bought the Wolfeboro line, running tourist trains from 1980 until 1985. In 1985, the line was purchased by the State of New Hampshire, which uses the right-of-way as the Wolfeboro Recreational Rail Trail, now known as the Cotton Valley Rail Trail. The rails are intact, and they are actively used by rail clubs. The rail corridor is maintained by members of the Cotton Valley Rail Trail Club. In 1987, Wolfeboro Station was struck by lightning and caught fire, and it was repaired by the town.
