= North Stratford Railroad =

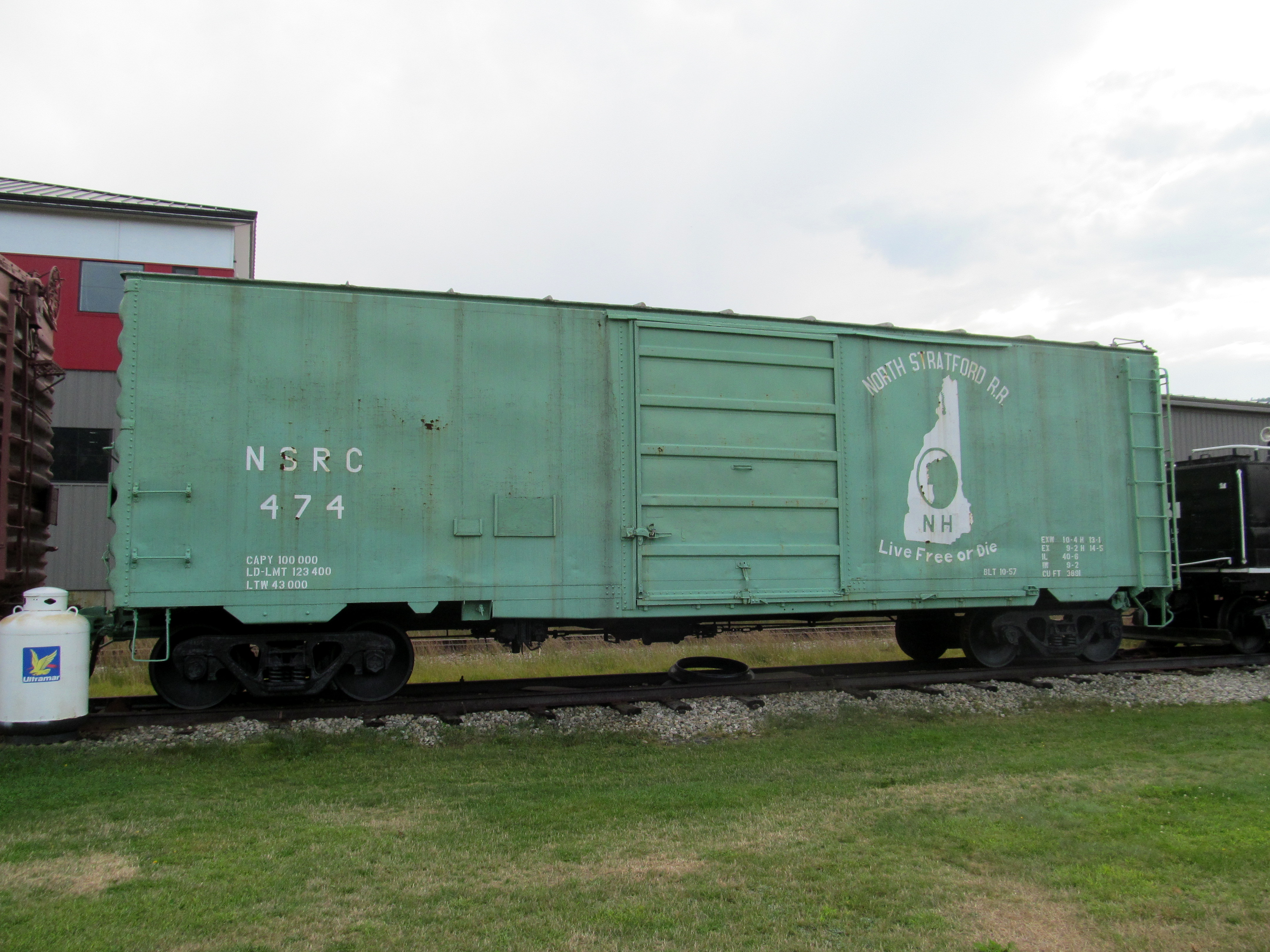
North Stratford Railroad boxcar on display at Gorham Historical Society

The North Stratford Railroad (reporting mark NSRC) was an interstate railroad in northeastern Vermont and northwestern New Hampshire. It ran from the village of North Stratford, New Hampshire (in the town of Stratford) to the village of Beecher Falls in Canaan, Vermont, a distance of approximately 23 miles (37 km).

== History ==
=== Origin of the line ===
Map of the Beecher Falls Branch of the MEC, the predecessor to the North Stratford

The line was originally conceived by George van Dyke, who owned large tracts of forest in Vermont and Quebec. Starting in 1883, van Dyke obtained the following charters to build the line, listed from south to north:

- Upper Coos Railroad of New Hampshire (first section) - 14 miles (23 km) in New Hampshire
- Coos Valley Railroad - 12 miles (19 km) in Vermont
- Upper Coos Railroad of New Hampshire (second section) - 30 miles (48 km) in New Hampshire
- Upper Coos Railroad of Vermont - 2 miles (3.2 km) in Vermont
- Hereford Railroad - 53 miles (85 km) in Quebec, Canada

Construction began in 1887 on the second section of the Upper Coos Railroad of New Hampshire between North Stratford, where the railroad connected to the Grand Trunk Railway, and Stewartstown, New Hampshire. Operations started the same year. A bridge across the Connecticut River from Stewartstown to Beecher Falls was built in 1888, and the Upper Coos Railroad of Vermont was completed north to the border a few months later. In Canada, 34 miles (55 km) of track of the Hereford Railroad from the border near Beecher Falls north to Cookshire, Quebec were laid in 1889, allowing interchange with the Canadian Pacific Railway. In 1890 the final 19 miles (31 km) of track in Quebec were laid to Lime Ridge, which allowed interchange with the Quebec Central Railway in Dudswell, Quebec. Construction south of North Stratford took longer, and the entire section went into service in 1891. In this area, the line connected to the Boston and Maine Railroad in Lancaster, New Hampshire, again at Waumbeck Junction in Jefferson, New Hampshire, and then met the Maine Central Railroad at Quebec Junction in Carroll, New Hampshire.

=== Maine Central Railroad ===
In 1890, the Maine Central Railroad gained control of the line through a series of leases. The MEC operated the line without fanfare until 1925, when it canceled its lease with the Hereford Railroad. After an extended legal battle, the tracks from the border north to Malvina, Quebec were removed. In 1948, the MEC negotiated trackage rights with the Grand Trunk Railway and the Boston and Maine Railroad between North Stratford and Lancaster. This rendered 12 miles (19 km) of track in Vermont and 7 miles (11 km) in New Hampshire redundant, and the rails were removed. Traffic on the section from North Stratford to Beecher Falls remained sufficient to keep the line open through the 1960s, but had declined enough by the early 1970s that the MEC embargoed the line after floods in 1973. The MEC filed for abandonment, but was forced to reopen the line in 1974.

=== North Stratford Railroad ===
In 1976 the state of New Hampshire bought the track between North Stratford and Beecher Falls from MEC, which had finally obtained permission to abandon it. A separate, short section of track between Waumbeck Junction and Quebec Junction was abandoned by the MEC at this time as well. The state chartered the North Stratford Railroad Corporation to operate the line, which primarily served a furniture plant in Beecher Falls. Traffic tapered off as the main shipper moved more and more goods by truck, and the line was embargoed in 1989.

For a short time in 1981, the North Stratford Railroad also operated the White Mountain Branch between Concord and Lincoln as an interim operator before the New England Southern Railroad stepped in.

== Stations ==
This list is incomplete.

- Guildhall, Vermont
- Stevens, Vermont
- Maidstone, Vermont
- Mason’s, NH
- Cone’s, NH
- Arlin’s, NH
- Colebrook, NH
- W. Stewarrstown, NH
- Beecher Falls, Vermont
