= Contoocook River Railroad =

American railway company

Map

The Contoocook River Railroad, or CRR, is a former railway company in New Hampshire. The CRR was first established on June 24, 1848, as Contoocook Valley Railroad founded and built on a standard gauge railway line from Contoocook to Hillsboro which was opened in December 1849. The 14.7 mile long route branched in Contoocook with the Concord and Claremont Railroad. The southern continuation of this path toward Massachusetts was subsequently amended to include the Peterborough and Hillsborough Railroad.

On October 1, 1857, the reorganization was carried out and the line was renamed to Contoocook River Railroad. The railway company merged on October 31, 1873, with the Merrimac and Connecticut Rivers Railroad, the old Concord & Claremont had taken over, and the Sugar River Railroad was assumed by the Concord and Claremont Railroad. In 1884, the Boston and Lowell Railroad leased the rail line and eventually was purchased by the Boston and Maine Corporation in 1890. The track is no longer in operation today.
