= Concord and Montreal Railroad =

Map

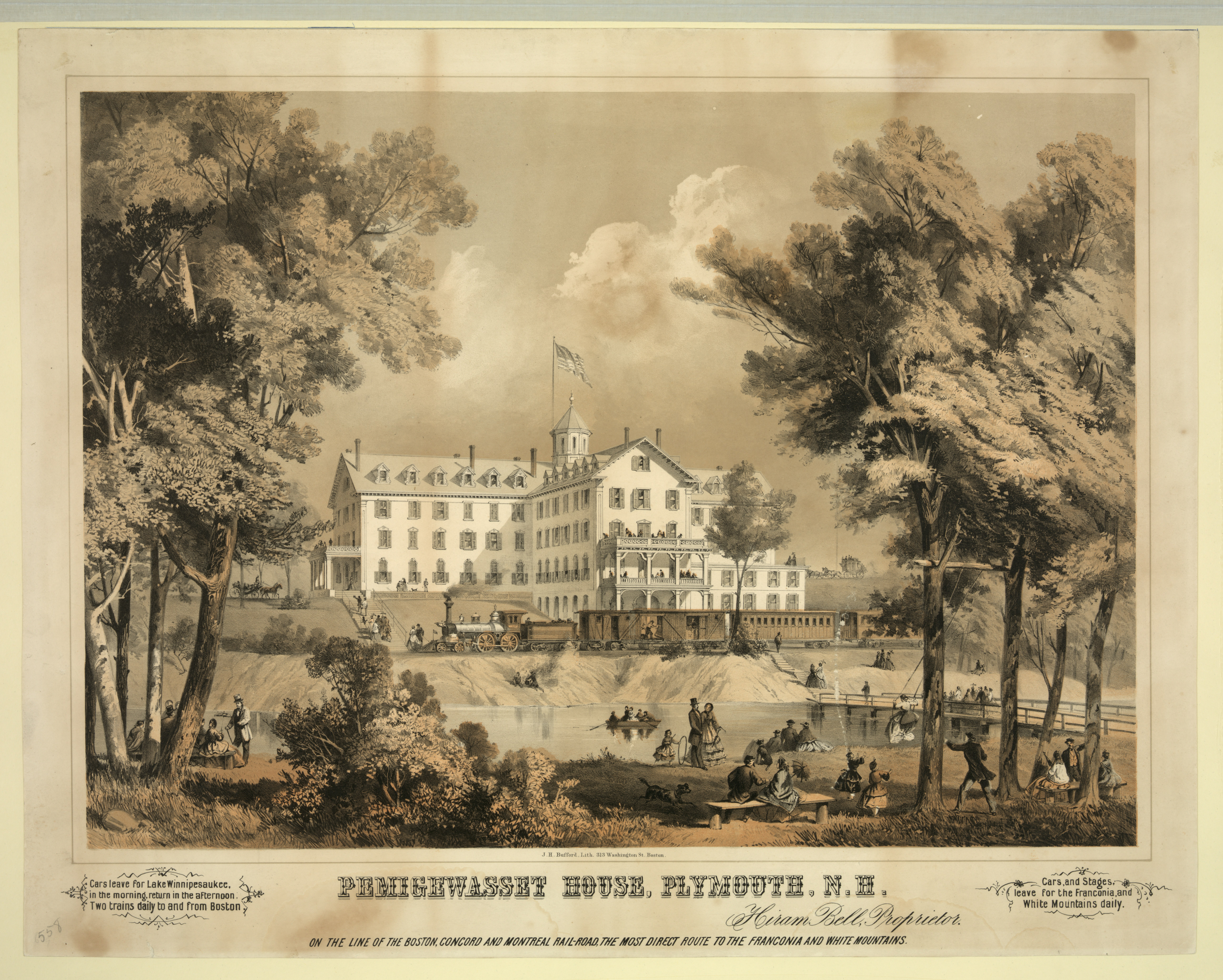
Line of the Boston, Concord and Montreal Railroad at Pemigewasset House, Plymouth, New Hampshire

The Concord and Montreal Railroad was a railroad incorporated in 1889 out of a merger between the Boston, Concord and Montreal Railroad and the Concord Railroad.

== Ownership ==
The Boston, Concord and Montreal had previously become the Northern Division of the Boston and Lowell Railroad, following an 1884 leasing agreement. The Boston and Lowell was then leased by the Boston and Maine Railroad in 1887, bringing the BC&M under the Boston and Maine's control. The merger with the Concord Railroad in 1889 led to the Concord and Montreal being under its own, independent control upon its incorporation. However, the railroad was ultimately purchased by the Boston and Maine in 1895.
