= History of rail transportation in the United States =

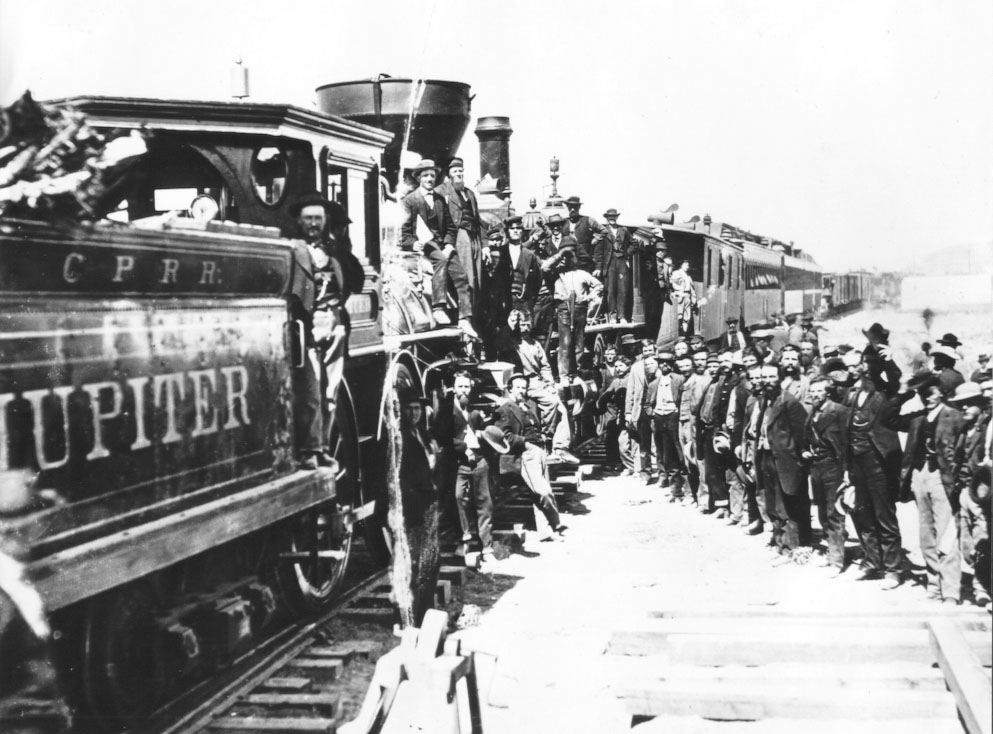
The first transcontinental railroad was completed in 1869.

Railroads played a large role in the development of the United States from the Industrial Revolution in the Northeast (1820s–1850s) to the settlement of the West (1850s–1890s). The American railroad mania began with the founding of the first passenger and freight line in the country, the Baltimore and Ohio Railroad, in 1827 and the "Laying of the First Stone" ceremonies. Its long construction westward over the Appalachian Mountains began in the next year. It flourished with continuous railway building projects for the next 45 years until the financial Panic of 1873, followed by a major economic depression that bankrupted many companies and temporarily stymied growth.

Railroads increased the speed of transport and dramatically lowered its cost. In the West where navigable rivers were few, the low cost allowed shipping of primary sector products hundreds of miles at a profit. Converting the Great American Desert of the Louisiana Purchase into the American breadbasket took decades rather than centuries.

Though the antebellum South started early to build railways, the absence of an interconnected network was a major handicap of Confederate railroads in the American Civil War (1861–1865). Lines already linked every city in the North and Midwest before the war. In the heavily settled Midwestern Corn Belt, over 80 percent of farms were within 5 miles (8 km) of a railway, facilitating the shipment of grain, hogs, and cattle to national and international markets. Many shortline railroads were built, but the majority were consolidated into 20 trunk lines by 1890. State and local governments often subsidized lines but rarely owned them. The economic importance and complexity of this new national system, and failures in management, inspired the first federal regulatory agency, the Interstate Commerce Commission in the 1880s.

The system was largely built by 1910. However, federal and state policies to subsidize, fund, and prioritize new competitors against railroads resulted in decline. The large system of highways built and owned by public authorities, operating at a loss and rather than a profit, allowed trucks to eat away freight traffic. Automobiles (and later airplanes, which were also subsidized via airports, air traffic control, etc.) devoured the passenger traffic. After 1940, the replacement of steam with diesel electric locomotives made for much more efficient operations that needed fewer workers on the road and in repair shops.

A series of bankruptcies and consolidations left the rail system in the hands of a few large operations by the 1980s. Almost all long-distance passenger traffic shifted to Amtrak in 1971, a government-owned operation. Commuter rail service is provided near a few major cities, including New York City, Chicago, Boston, Philadelphia, Baltimore, and Washington, D.C. Computerization and improved equipment steadily reduced employment, which peaked at 2.1 million in 1920, falling to 1.2 million in 1950 and 215,000 in 2010. Route mileage peaked at 254,251 miles (409,177 km) in 1916 and fell to 139,679 miles (224,792 km) in 2011.

Freight railroads continue to play an important role in the United States' economy, especially for moving imports and exports using containers, and for bulk shipments of coal and (since 2010) oil. Productivity rose 172% between 1981 and 2000, while rates rose 55% (after accounting for inflation). Rail's share of the American freight market rose to 43%, the highest for any rich country, primarily due to external factors such as geography and higher use of goods like coal. In recent years, railroads have gradually been losing intermodal traffic to trucking.

== Early period (to 1860) ==
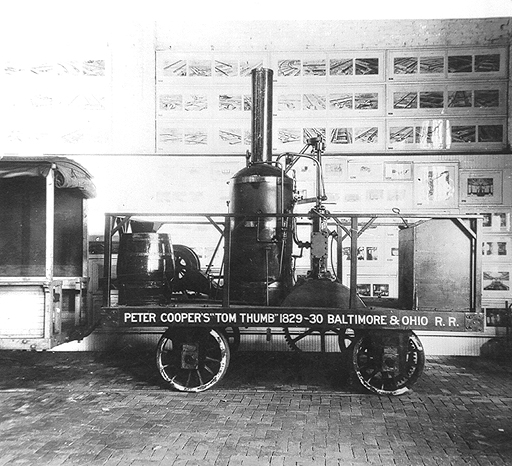
Replica of the "Tom Thumb" locomotive, photographed in 1927

The animal powered Leiper Railroad followed in 1810 after the preceding successful experiment—designed and built by merchant Thomas Leiper, the railway connected Crum Creek to Ridley Creek, in Delaware County, Pennsylvania. It was used until 1829, when it was temporarily replaced by the Leiper Canal, then it was reopened to replace the canal in 1852. This was the first railroad meant to be permanent and the first to evolve into trackage of a common carrier after an intervening closure.

In 1826 Massachusetts incorporated Quincy's Granite Railway as a common freight carrier to primarily haul granite for the construction of the Bunker Hill Monument; operations began later that year, and which still had a section of it operating until the 1940s.

Other railroads authorized by states in 1826 and constructed in the following years included the Delaware and Hudson Canal Company's gravity railroad; and the Mohawk and Hudson Railroad, to carry freight and passengers around a bend in the Erie Canal. To link the Port of Baltimore to the Ohio River, in 1827 Maryland chartered the Baltimore and Ohio Railroad (B&O), the first section of which opened in 1830. Similarly, the South Carolina Canal and Railroad Company was chartered in 1827 to connect Charleston to the Savannah River, and Pennsylvania built the Main Line of Public Works between Philadelphia and the Ohio River.

=== Steam locomotives ===
The South Carolina Canal and Rail Road Company was the first to use steam locomotives regularly beginning with the Best Friend of Charleston, the first American-built locomotive intended for revenue service, in December 1830. The B&O started developing steam locomotives in 1829 with Peter Cooper's Tom Thumb. This was the first American-built locomotive to run in the U.S., although it was intended as a demonstration of the potential of steam traction rather than as a revenue-earning locomotive. Many of the earliest locomotives for American railroads were imported from England, including the Stourbridge Lion and the John Bull, but a domestic locomotive manufacturing industry was quickly established, with locomotives like the DeWitt Clinton being built in the 1830s. The B&O's westward route reached the Ohio River in 1852, the first eastern seaboard railroad to do so.

By 1850, 9,000 miles (14,000 km) of railroad lines had been built.

== Late 19th century ==
=== Land grants ===
The federal government operated a land grant system between 1855 and 1871, through which new railway companies in the west were given millions of acres they could sell to prospective farmers or pledge to bondholders. A total of 129 million acres (520,000 km^{2}) were granted to the railroads before the program ended, supplemented by a further 51 million acres (210,000 km^{2}) granted by the states and by various government subsidies. This program enabled the opening of numerous western lines, especially the Union Pacific-Central Pacific with fast service from San Francisco to Omaha and east to Chicago. West of Chicago, many cities grew up as rail centers, with repair shops and a base of technically literate workers.

In return for the land grants, the railroads were required to haul government personnel and cargo at significantly reduced rates (generally half of the normal rate). The land was granted in a checkerboard fashion, with the government retaining every other section. The land that the government retained typically doubled in value as a result of the railroad being built.

The government guaranteed loans to several Pacific railroads, which were all paid off by 1899 ($63 million in principal and $105 million in interest). After receiving rate discounts of approximately 50% on government personnel and cargo for 80 years (including during two world wars), Congress finally discontinued the rate reductions at the end of World War II. The land grants had been more than paid for (several times over).

=== Displacing water routes ===
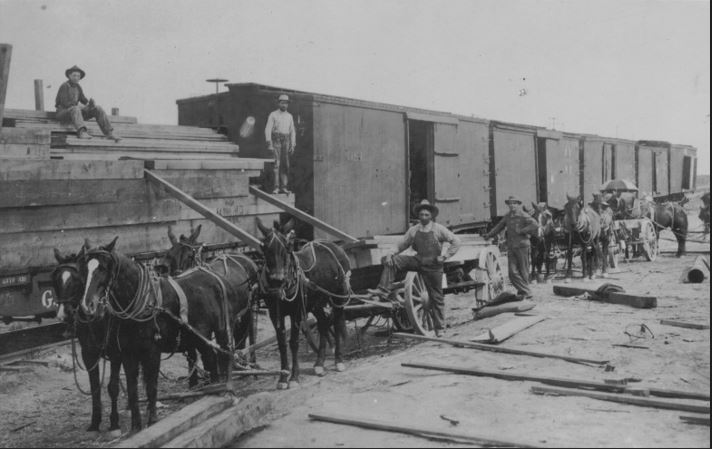
Freight being transferred from rail cars to wagons. When a rail line entered a region, typically stagecoach and wagon cartage (which was slower and more expensive) over that route ended. However, stage and wagon service would then be offered between the railroad and smaller off-line towns. As a result of the lower transportation costs provided by arrival of the railroad, overall economic activity in the region (e.g., farming, ranching and mining) grew dramatically.

Railroads replaced many canals and turnpikes and by the 1870s had significantly displaced steamboats as well. The railroads were superior to these alternative modes of transportation, particularly water routes because they lowered costs in two ways. Canals and rivers were unavailable in the winter season due to freezing, but the railroads ran year-round despite poor weather. And railroads were safer: the likelihood of a train crash was less than the likelihood of a boat sinking. The railroads provided cost-effective transportation because they allowed shippers to have a smaller inventory of goods, which reduced storage costs during winter, and to avoid insurance costs from the risk of losing goods during transit.

=== Changing style of travel ===
Likewise, railroads changed the style of transportation. For the common person in the early 19th century, transportation was often by horse or stagecoach. The network of trails along which coaches navigated were riddled with ditches, potholes, and stones. This made travel fairly uncomfortable, and coaches were cramped with little leg room. Travel by train offered a new style. Locomotives proved themselves a smooth, headache free ride with plenty of room to move around. Some passenger trains offered meals in the spacious dining car followed by a good night sleep in the private sleeping quarters.

=== Networks ===
Railroad companies in the North and Midwest constructed networks that linked nearly every major city by 1860. In the heavily settled Corn Belt (from Ohio to Iowa), over 80 percent of farms were within 5 miles (8.0 km) of a railway. A large number of short lines were built, but due to a fast-developing financial system based on Wall Street and oriented to railway securities, the majority were consolidated into 20 trunk lines by 1890. Most of these railroads made money, and ones that were unprofitable were bought up and incorporated in a larger system or "rationalized". Although the transcontinental railroads dominated the media, with the completion of the First transcontinental railroad in 1869 dramatically symbolizing the nation's unification after the divisiveness of the Civil War, most construction actually took place in the industrial Northeast and agricultural Midwest, and was designed to minimize shipping times and costs. The railroads in the South were repaired and expanded and then, after a lot of preparation, changed from a 5-foot gauge to standard gauge of 4 foot 8 ½ inches in two days in May 1886.

With its extensive river system, the United States supported a large array of horse-drawn or mule-drawn barges on canals and paddle wheel steamboats on rivers that competed with railroads after 1815 until the 1870s. The canals and steamboats lost out because of the dramatic increases in efficiency and speed of the railroads, which could go almost anywhere year-round. The railroads were faster and went to many places a canal would be impractical or too expensive to build or a natural river never went. Railroads also had better scheduling since they often could go year-round, more or less ignoring the weather. Canals and river traffic were cheaper if you lived on or near a canal or river that wasn't frozen over part of the year, but only a few did. Long-distance transport of goods by wagon to a canal or river was slow and expensive. A railroad to a city made it an inland "port" that often prospered or turned a town into a city.

=== Civil War and Reconstruction (1861–1877) ===
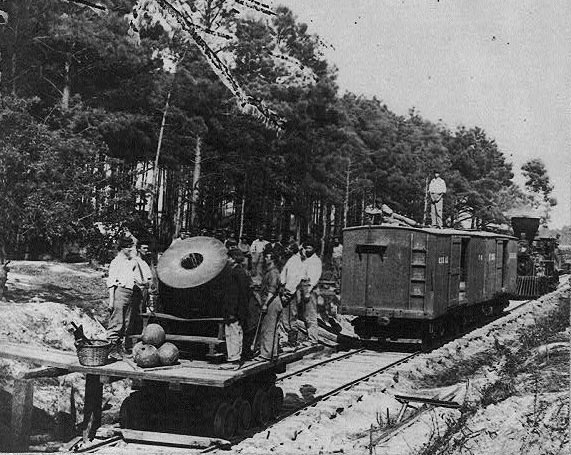
A mortar mounted on a railroad car used during the Civil War, 1865

Rail was strategic during the American Civil War, and the Union used its much larger system much more effectively. Practically all the mills and factories supplying rails and equipment were in the North, and the Union blockade kept the South from getting new equipment or spare parts. The war was fought in the South, and Union raiders (and sometimes Confederates too) systematically destroyed bridges and rolling stock—and sometimes bent rails—to hinder the logistics of the enemy.

In the South, most railroads in 1860 were local affairs connecting cotton regions with the nearest waterway. Most transports were by boat, not rail, and after the Union blockaded the ports in 1861 and seized the key rivers in 1862, long-distance travel was difficult. The outbreak of war had a depressing effect on the economic fortunes of the railroad companies, for the hoarding of the cotton crop in an attempt to force European intervention left railroads bereft of their main source of income. Many had to lay off employees, and in particular, let go skilled technicians and engineers. For the early years of the war, the Confederate government had a hands-off approach to the railroads. Only in mid-1863 did the Confederate government initiate an overall policy, and it was confined solely to aiding the war effort. With the legislation of impressment the same year, railroads and their rolling stock came under the de facto control of the Confederate military.

Conditions deteriorated rapidly in the Confederacy, as there was no new equipment, and raids on both sides systematically destroyed key bridges as well as locomotives and freight cars. Spare parts were cannibalized; feeder lines were torn up to get replacement rails for trunk lines, and the heavy use of rolling stock wore them out. In 1864–65 the Confederate railroad network collapsed; little traffic moved in 1865.

Golden spike ceremony for the completion of the First Transcontinental Railroad, May 1869, at Promontory Summit, U.T.

The Southern states had blocked westward rail expansion before 1860, but after secession the Pacific Railroad Acts were passed in 1862 and 1863, which respectively established the central Pacific route and the standard gauge to be used. With federal financing in the form of bonds and generous land grants and with the heroic help of the mainly Chinese and Irish laborers, Central Pacific Railroad working eastward and Union Pacific Railroad working westward combined in 1869 to complete the First transcontinental railroad, which linked by rail the eastern states with the Pacific coast and made possible moving from New York to San Francisco Bay in only six days. In addition, other transcontinentals were built in the South (Southern Pacific, Santa Fe) and in the North along the Canada–US border (Northern Pacific, Great Northern), accelerating the settlement of the West by offering inexpensive farms and ranches on credit, carrying pioneers and supplies westward, and cattle, wheat and minerals eastward. In 1860 before the transcontinentals, railroads carried less than half as much freight as inland waterways, whereas by 1890 railroads carried five times as much freight as waterways.

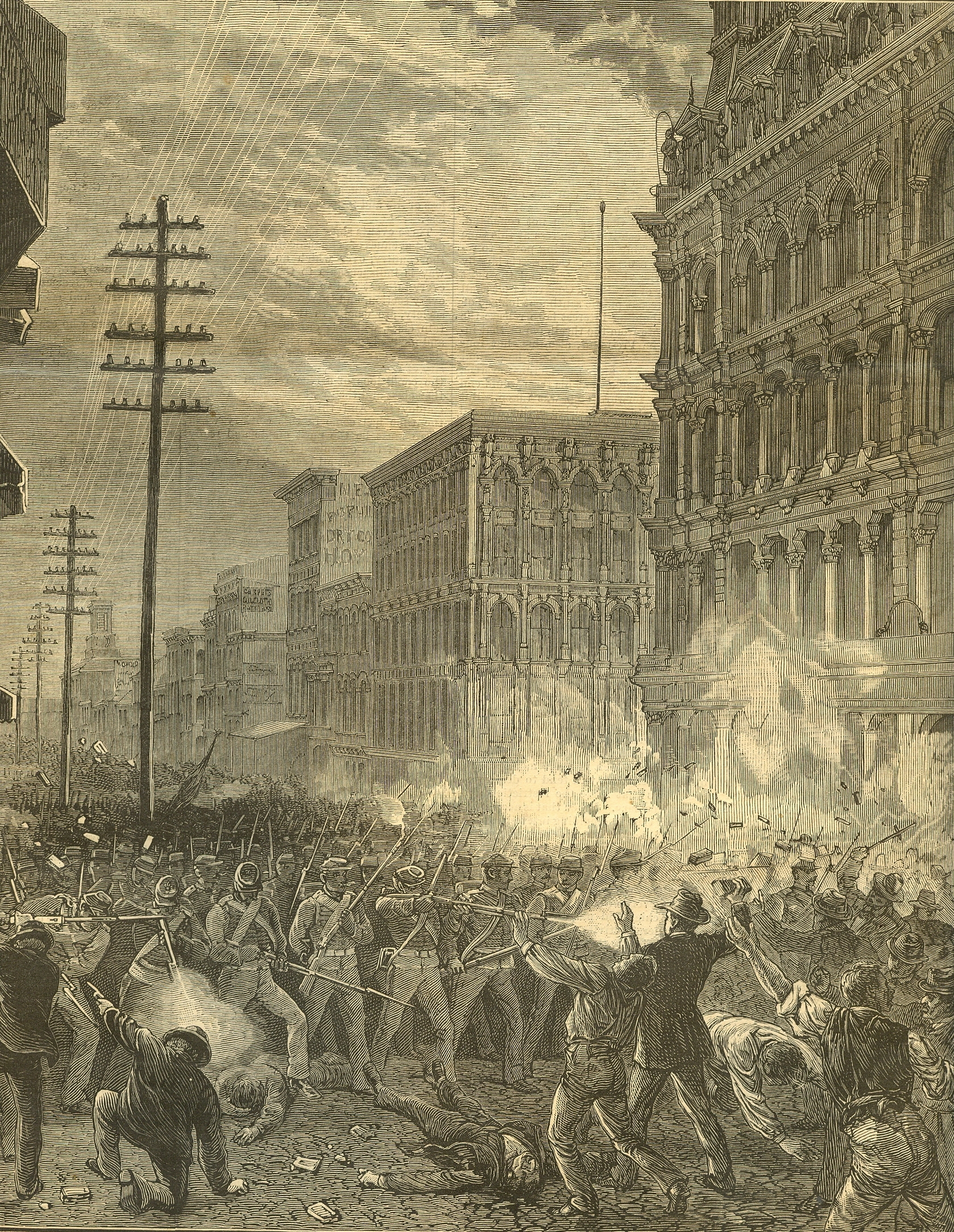
Strikers in Baltimore confronting the Maryland National Guard, July 1877

During the Reconstruction era, Northern money financed the rebuilding and dramatic expansion of railroads throughout the South; they were modernized in terms of track gauge, equipment, and standards of service. The southern network expanded from 11,000 miles (17,700 km) in 1870 to 29,000 miles (46,700 km) in 1890. The lines were owned and directed overwhelmingly by Northerners. Railroads helped create a mechanically skilled group of craftsmen and broke the isolation of much of the region. Passengers were few, however, and apart from hauling the cotton crop when it was harvested, there was little freight traffic.

The Panic of 1873 ended rapid rail expansion in the United States. Many lines went bankrupt or were barely able to pay the interest on their bonds, and workers were laid off on a mass scale, with those still employed subject to large cuts in wages. This worsening situation for railroad workers led to strikes against many railroads, culminating in the Great Railroad Strike of 1877, involving over 100,000 people in multiple cities. The strike began on July 14 in Martinsburg, West Virginia, in response to the cutting of wages for the second time in a year by the B&O Railroad. The strike and related violence spread through the country, lasted for 45 days, and ended with the intervention of local and state militias as well as federal troops. Labor unrest continued into the 1880s, such as the Great Southwest Railroad Strike of 1886, which involved over 200,000 workers.

== Expansion and consolidation (1878–1916) ==
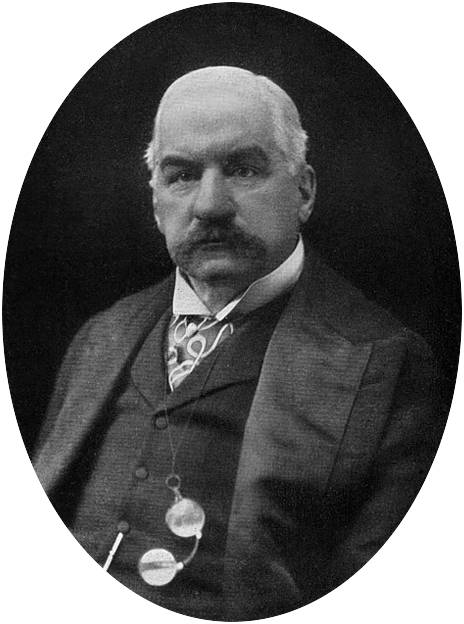
J.P. Morgan

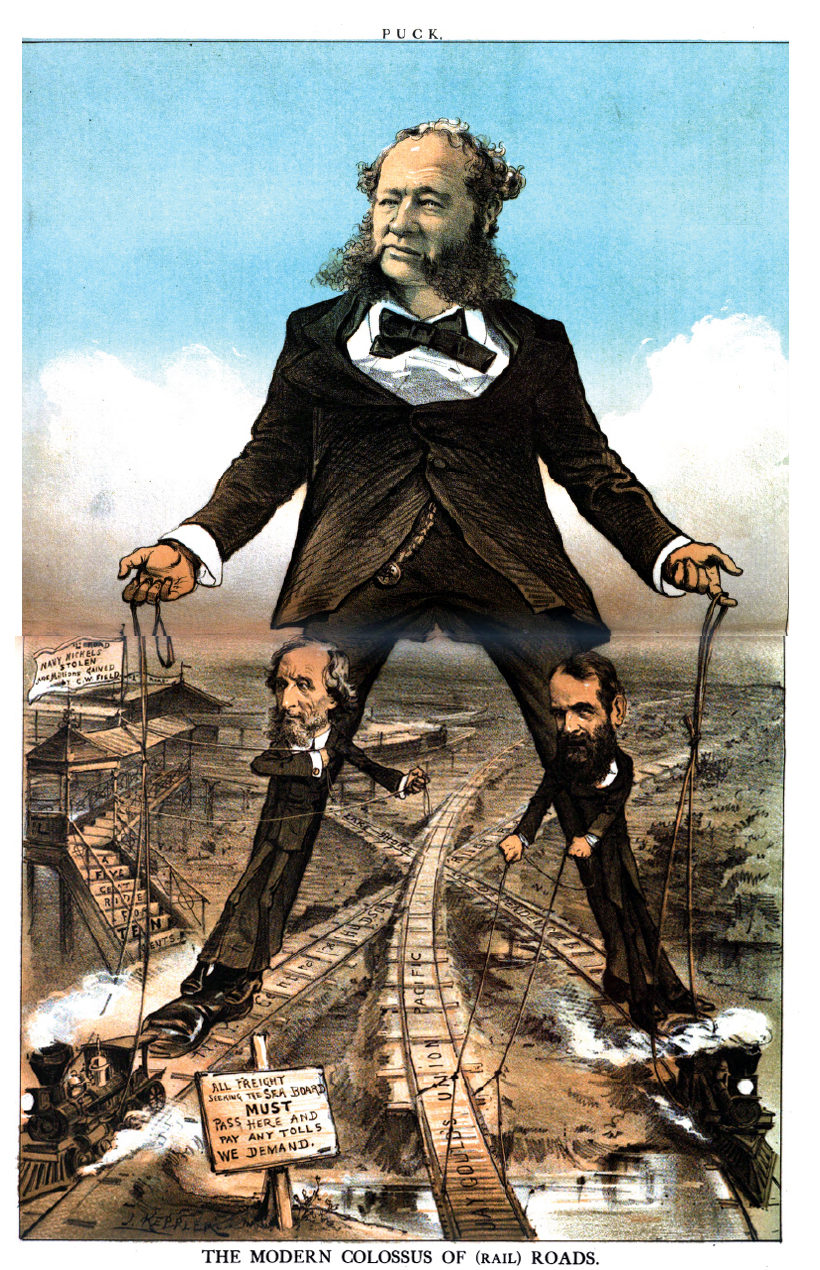
1879 cartoon depicting William Henry Vanderbilt as "The Modern Colossus of (Rail) Roads"

By 1880 the nation had 17,800 freight locomotives carrying 23,600 tons of freight, and 22,200 passenger locomotives. The railroad industry was the nation's largest employer outside of the agricultural sector. The effects of the railways on rapid industrial growth were many, including the opening of hundreds of millions of acres of very good farm land ready for mechanization, lower costs for food and all goods, a huge national sales market, the creation of a culture of engineering excellence, and the creation of the modern system of management.

On January 12, 1883, the southern section of the second transcontinental railroad line was completed as the Southern Pacific tracks from Los Angeles met the Galveston, Harrisburg and San Antonio Railway at a location 3 miles (4.8 km) west of the Pecos River near Langtry, Texas.

New York financier J. P. Morgan played an increasingly dominant role in consolidating the rail system in the late 19th century. He orchestrated reorganizations and consolidations in all parts of the United States. Morgan raised large sums in Europe, where an active section of the London Stock Exchange was dedicated to "American rails", but instead of only handling the funds, he helped the railroads reorganize and achieve greater efficiencies. He fought against the speculators interested in speculative profits and built a vision of an integrated transportation system. In 1885 he reorganized the New York, West Shore & Buffalo Railroad, leasing it to the New York Central. In 1886, he reorganized the Philadelphia & Reading, and in 1888 the Chesapeake & Ohio. He was heavily involved with railroad tycoon James J. Hill and the Great Northern Railway.

Industrialists such as Morgan, Cornelius Vanderbilt, and Jay Gould became wealthy through railroad ownerships, as large railroad companies such as the Grand Trunk Railway and the Southern Pacific Transportation Company spanned several states. In response to monopolistic practices and other excesses of some railroads and their owners, Congress passed the Interstate Commerce Act and created the Interstate Commerce Commission (ICC) in 1887. The ICC indirectly controlled the business activities of the railroads through the issuance of extensive regulations.

Morgan set up conferences in 1889 and 1890 that brought together railroad presidents in order to help the industry follow the new laws and write agreements for the maintenance of "public, reasonable, uniform and stable rates." The conferences were the first of their kind, and by creating a community of interest among competing lines paved the way for the great consolidations of the early 20th century. Congress responded by enacting antitrust legislation to prohibit monopolies of railroads (and other industries), beginning with the Sherman Antitrust Act in 1890.

The Panic of 1893 was the largest economic depression in U.S. history at that time. It was the result of railroad overbuilding and shaky railroad financing, which set off a series of bank failures. One-quarter of U.S. railroads had failed by mid-1894, representing over 40,000 miles (64,000 km). The failed lines included the Northern Pacific Railway, the Union Pacific Railroad and the Atchison, Topeka & Santa Fe Railroad. Acquisitions of the bankrupt companies led to further consolidation of ownership. As of 1906, two-thirds of the rail mileage in the U.S. was controlled by seven entities, with the New York Central, Pennsylvania Railroad, and Morgan having the largest portions.

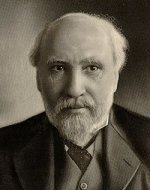
James J. Hill

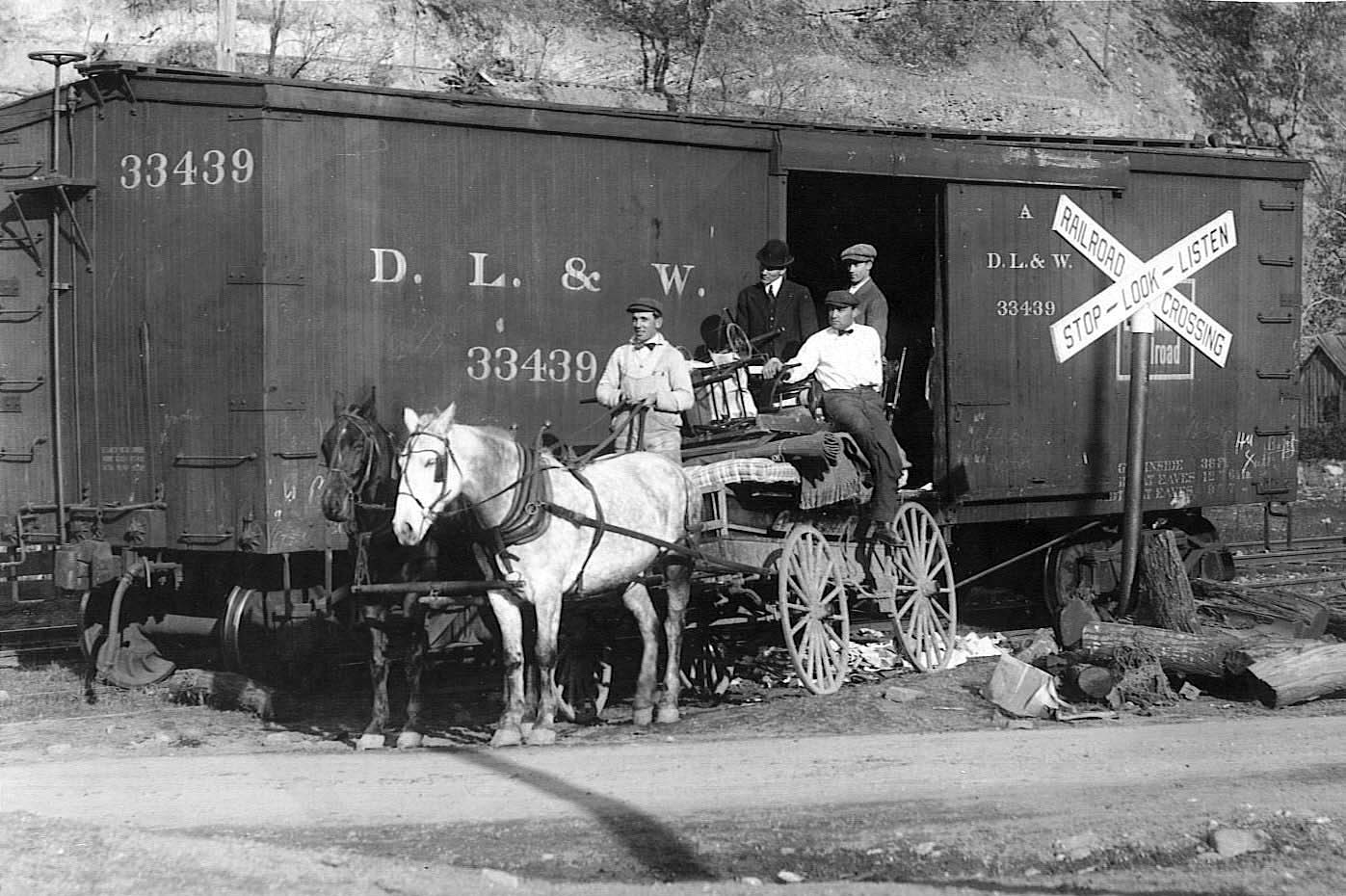
A Delaware, Lackawanna, and Western Railroad wagon at a level crossing, circa 1900

Hill joined forces with Morgan and others to gain control of the Northern Pacific. Hill formed the Northern Securities Company to consolidate the operations of the Northern Pacific with Hill's own Great Northern, but President Theodore Roosevelt strongly disapproved and took it to court. In 1904 the federal courts dissolved the Northern Security Company in Northern Securities Co. v. United States, and the railroads had to go their separate, competitive ways. By that time Morgan and Hill had ensured the Northern Pacific was well-organized and able to survive easily on its own.

In 1901 the Union Pacific Railroad acquired all the stock of the Southern Pacific. The federal government charged Union Pacific with violating the Sherman Act, and in 1913 the Supreme Court ordered Union Pacific to divest itself of all Southern Pacific stock. This ruling was received with considerable alarm throughout the industry, since the two were not considered to be significant competitors. (Later in the 20th century, with different economic conditions and changes in the law, Union Pacific successfully acquired the Southern Pacific.)

Continuing concern over rate discrimination by railroads led Congress to enact additional laws, giving increased regulatory powers to the ICC. The 1906 Hepburn Act gave the ICC authority to set maximum rates and review the companies' financial records. The Mann-Elkins Act of 1910 strengthened the ICC's authority over railroad rates. Subsequently, railroads had difficulty securing revenue sufficient to keep pace with their rising costs, and by 1915 one-sixth of the railroad trackage in the country belonged to railroads in receivership.

== Nationalized management (1916–1920) ==
U.S. railroads were at their peak length of trackage in 1916 with 254,037 miles (408,833 km) of tracks. The United States Railroad Administration (USRA) temporarily took over management of railroads during World War I to address inadequacy in critical facilities throughout the overall system, such as terminals, trackage, and rolling stock. President Woodrow Wilson issued an order for nationalization on December 26, 1917. Management by USRA led to standardization of equipment, reductions of duplicative passenger services, and better coordination of freight traffic. Federal control of the railroads ended in March 1920 under the Esch–Cummins Act.

== Rise of the trucking industry (1921–1945) ==
In the late 19th century pipelines were built for the oil trade, and in the 20th century trucking and aviation emerged. Following World War I, some members of Congress, the ICC, and some railroad executives developed concerns about inefficiencies in the American railroad system. Memories of the 1893 panic, the continuing proliferation of railroad companies, and duplicative facilities fueled this concern. To an extent, the need to nationalize the system during the war was an example of this inefficiency. These concerns were the impetus for legislation to consider improvements to the system. The Esch-Cummins Act directed the ICC to prepare and adopt a plan for the consolidation of the railroad companies into a limited number of systems.

During the 1920s the railroad industry, with its rates and routes continuing to be set by the ICC, was facing increasing competition from other modes of transportation: trucking and airplanes. These competing modes were basically unregulated at the time; this competition was not acknowledged in the railroad legislation. The newer transport modes also received extensive financial assistance from government, such as in the construction of highways and rural roads, and the construction of airports. The competition contributed to the railroads' eventual decline in the 1920s and beyond, and which was amplified in the 1930s during the Great Depression.

In 1929 the ICC published its proposed Complete Plan of Consolidation, also known as the "Ripley Plan," after its author, William Z. Ripley of Harvard University. The agency held hearings on the plan, but none of the proposed consolidations was implemented. Many small railroads failed during the Great Depression. Of those lines that survived, the stronger ones were not interested in supporting the weaker ones. In 1940 Congress formally abandoned the Ripley Plan.

== Modern era (1946–present) ==
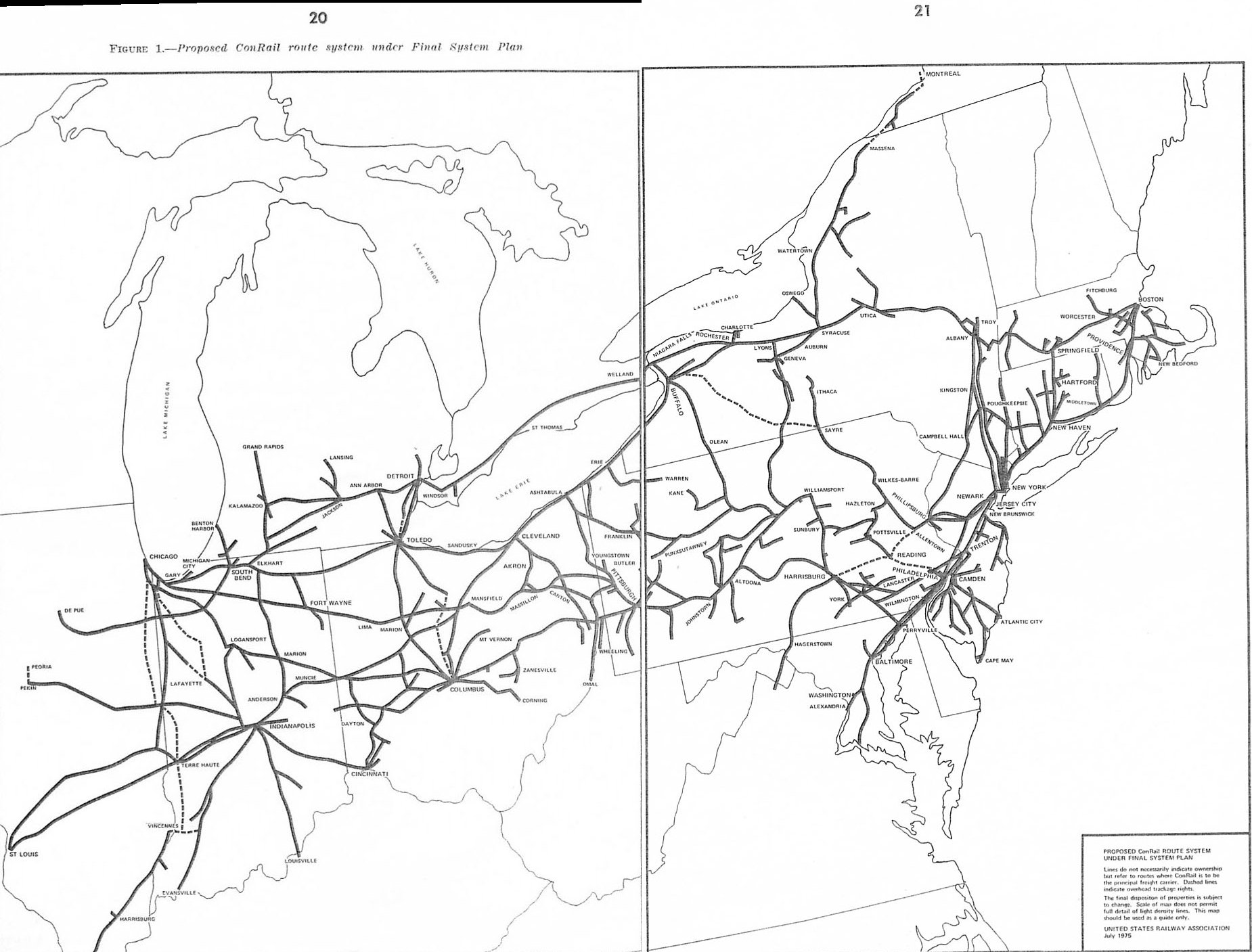
Lines to be taken over by Conrail in 1976 (in the event, Conrail took over EL and RDG as well)

During the post-World War II boom many railroads were driven out of business due to competition from airlines and Interstate highways. The rise of the automobile led to the end of passenger train service on most railroads. Trucking businesses had become major competitors by the 1930s with the advent of improved paved roads, and after the war they expanded their operations as the Interstate highway network grew, and acquired increased market share of freight business. Railroads continued to carry bulk freight such as coal, steel and other commodities. However, the ICC continued to regulate railroad rates and other aspects of railroad operations, which limited railroads' flexibility in responding to changing market forces.

In 1966, Congress created the Federal Railroad Administration (FRA) to issue and enforce rail safety regulations, administer railroad assistance programs, and conduct research and development in support of improved railroad safety and national rail transportation policy. The safety functions were transferred from the ICC. The FRA was established as part of the newly created Department of Transportation.

Two of the largest remaining railroads, the Pennsylvania Railroad and the New York Central, merged in 1968 to form the Penn Central. At the insistence of the ICC the New York, New Haven and Hartford Railroad was added to the merger in 1969; in 1970 the Penn Central declared bankruptcy, the largest bankruptcy in U.S. history until then. Other bankrupt railroads included the Ann Arbor Railroad (1973), Erie Lackawanna Railway (1972), Lehigh Valley Railroad (1970), Reading Company (1971), Central Railroad of New Jersey (1967) and Lehigh and Hudson River Railway (1972).

The National Association of Railroad Passengers, a non-profit advocacy group, was organized in the late 1960s to support the operation of passenger trains. In 1970 under the Rail Passenger Service Act, Congress created a government corporation, Amtrak, to take over operation of Penn Central passenger lines and selected inter-city passenger services from other private railroads. Amtrak began operations in 1971, acquiring most of the right-of-way and facilities of the Penn Central Northeast Corridor from Washington, D.C. to Boston, under the Railroad Revitalization and Regulatory Reform Act of 1976.

Congress passed the Regional Rail Reorganization Act of 1973 (sometimes called the "3R Act") to salvage viable freight operations from the bankrupt Penn Central and other lines in the northeast, mid-Atlantic and midwestern regions, through the creation of the Consolidated Rail Corporation (ConRail), a government-owned corporation. Conrail began operations in 1976. The 3R Act also formed the United States Railway Association, another government corporation, taking over the powers of the ICC with respect to allowing the bankrupt railroads to abandon unprofitable lines. In addition to freight railroads, Conrail inherited commuter rail operations from several predecessor railroads in the northeast, and these operations continued to be unprofitable. State and local government transportation agencies took over the passenger operations and acquired the various rights-of-way from Conrail in 1983, pursuant to the Northeast Rail Service Act of 1981. To replace the loss of commuter passenger rail service outside of the northeast region, state and local agencies established their own commuter systems in several metropolitan areas, generally by leasing rail lines from Amtrak or freight railroads.

Beginning in the late 1970s Amtrak eliminated several of its lightly traveled lines. Ridership stagnated at roughly 20 million passengers per year amid uncertain government aid from 1981 to about 2000. Ridership increased during the first decade of the 21st century after implementation of capital improvements in the Northeast Corridor and rises in automobile fuel costs.

Resurgence of freight railroads in the 1980s

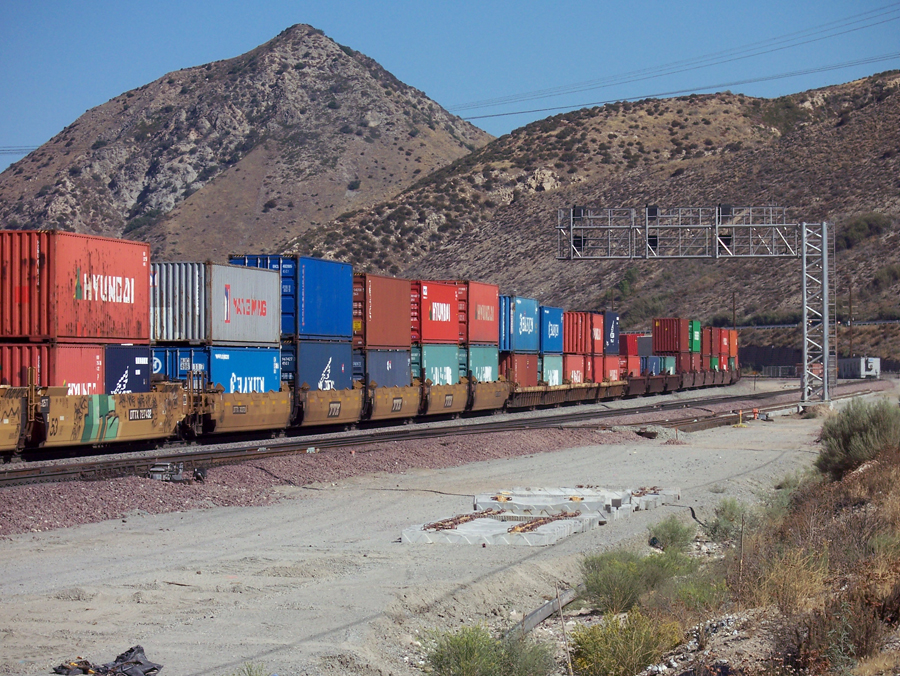
The use of double-stack rail cars and intermodal containers, facilitated by deregulation, has improved railroads' competitiveness.

In 1980 Congress enacted the Staggers Rail Act to revive freight traffic by removing restrictive regulations and enabling railroads to be more competitive with the trucking industry. The Northeast Rail Service Act of 1981 authorized additional deregulation of northeast railroads. Among other things, these laws reduced the role of the ICC in regulating the railroads and allowed the carriers to discontinue unprofitable routes. More railroad companies merged and consolidated their lines in order to remain successful. These changes led to the current system of fewer, but profitable, Class I railroads covering larger regions of the United States.

Since the beginning of the current deregulatory era, the following Class I railroads have been involved in mergers:

- Union Pacific acquired the Missouri Pacific and Missouri–Kansas–Texas Railroad in the 1980s, the Chicago and North Western in 1995, and the Southern Pacific in 1996
- CSX was formed in 1986 from the Chessie System and the Seaboard System
- BNSF Railway was formed in 1996 from the Atchison, Topeka and Santa Fe (the "Santa Fe") and Burlington Northern
- Norfolk Southern was formed in 1982 from the Norfolk and Western and Southern Railway
- Canadian Pacific acquired the Delaware and Hudson in 1991, and purchased the Kansas City Southern Railway in 2021
- Canadian National acquired the Illinois Central in 1999
- CSX and Norfolk Southern acquired most of the Conrail freight rail assets in 1997.

In 1995, when most of the ICC's powers had been eliminated, Congress finally abolished the agency and transferred its remaining functions to a new agency, the Surface Transportation Board.

== 21st century ==
In the early 21st century, several of the railroads, along with the federal government and various port agencies, began to reinvest in freight rail infrastructure, such as intermodal terminals and bridge and tunnel improvements. These projects are designed to increase capacity and efficiency across the national rail network. Two examples are the Heartland Corridor and the National Gateway.

Both the Bill Clinton and Barack Obama administrations had announced plans for new high-speed rail lines in their first terms. In the case of Clinton era, the only tangible outcome was the introduction of Amtrak's Acela Express, serving the Northeast Corridor, in 2000. Obama even mentioned his rail plans in his State of the Union address, the first time in decades a President had done so. While several small scale improvements to rail lines were financed by federal money, more ambitious plans in Florida, Ohio and other states failed when newly elected Republican governors stopped existing high-speed rail plans and returned federal funding.

In 2015 construction began on the California High-Speed Rail line. The Phase I portion, which would link Los Angeles and San Francisco in under three hours, was originally projected to be completed in 2029 at a cost of $40 billion. By 2018 however, the project experienced numerous delays and cost miscalculations, with an estimated completion date of 2033 and a cost of $98.1 billion.

The Infrastructure Investment and Jobs Act, enacted in 2021, provides a major funding increase for passenger rail systems, including new rail lines and replacement of level crossings. Improvements to the Northeast Corridor funded by the law include bridge replacements and the construction of new rail tunnels under the Hudson River (see Gateway Program).

Freight railroads continue to play an important role in the United States' economy, especially for moving imports and exports using containers, and for bulk shipments of coal and (since 2010) oil. Productivity rose 172% between 1981 and 2000, while rates rose 55% (after accounting for inflation). Rail's share of the American freight market rose to 43%, the highest for any rich country, primarily due to external factors such as geography and higher use of goods like coal. In recent years, railroads have gradually been losing intermodal traffic to trucking.

== Technology ==
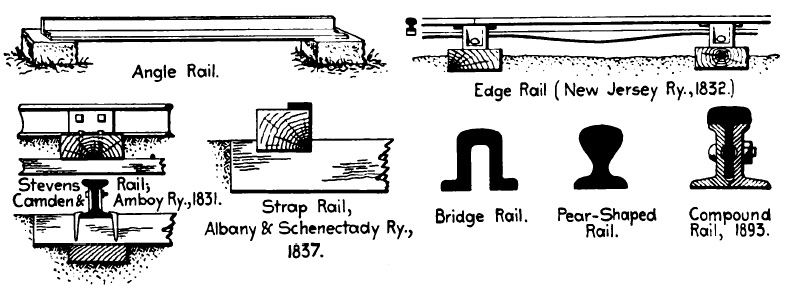
Rail profiles used in the 19th century

The B&O established its Mount Clare Shops in Baltimore in 1829. This was the first railroad manufacturing facility in the U.S., and the company built locomotives, railroad cars, iron bridges and other equipment there. Following the B&O example, railroad companies became self-sufficient as thousands of domestic machine shops turned out products, and thousands of inventors and tinkerers improved the equipment.

=== Rail manufacturing ===
In general, U.S. railroad companies imported technology from Britain in the 1830s, particularly strap iron rails, as there were no rail manufacturing facilities in the U.S. at that time. Heavy iron "T" rails were first manufactured in the U.S. in the mid-1840s at Mount Savage, Maryland and Danville, Pennsylvania. This improved rail design permitted higher train speeds and more reliable operation. Discovery of high-quality iron ores in the mid-19th century, particularly in the Iron Range, led to the fabrication of better-quality rails.

Steel rails began to replace iron later in the 19th century. Several railroads imported steel rails from England in the 1860s, and the first commercially available steel rails in the U.S. were manufactured in 1867 at the Cambria Iron Works in Johnstown, Pennsylvania. By the mid-1880s U.S. railroads were using more steel rails than iron in building new or replacement tracks.

=== Track gauge ===
Through the 1830s, 1840s, and 1850s, local projects and long-distance links were completed, so that by 1860 the eastern half of the continent, especially the Northeast, was linked by a network of connecting railroads. However, although Great Britain had early adopted a standard gauge of 4 ft 8 1/2 in (1,435 mm), once Americans started building locomotives, they experimented with different gauges, resulting in the standard gauge, or a close approximation, being adopted in the Northeast and Midwest, but a 5 ft (1,524 mm) gauge in the South, and a 5 ft 6 in (1,676 mm) gauge in Canada. The Erie Railway was built to 6 ft (1,829 mm) broad gauge, and in the 1870s a widespread movement looked at the cheaper 3 ft (914 mm) narrow gauge.

The Pacific Railway Act of 1863 established the standard gauge for the first transcontinental railroad. Except for the narrow gauge, gauges were standardized across North America after the end of the Civil War in 1865.

=== Locomotives ===
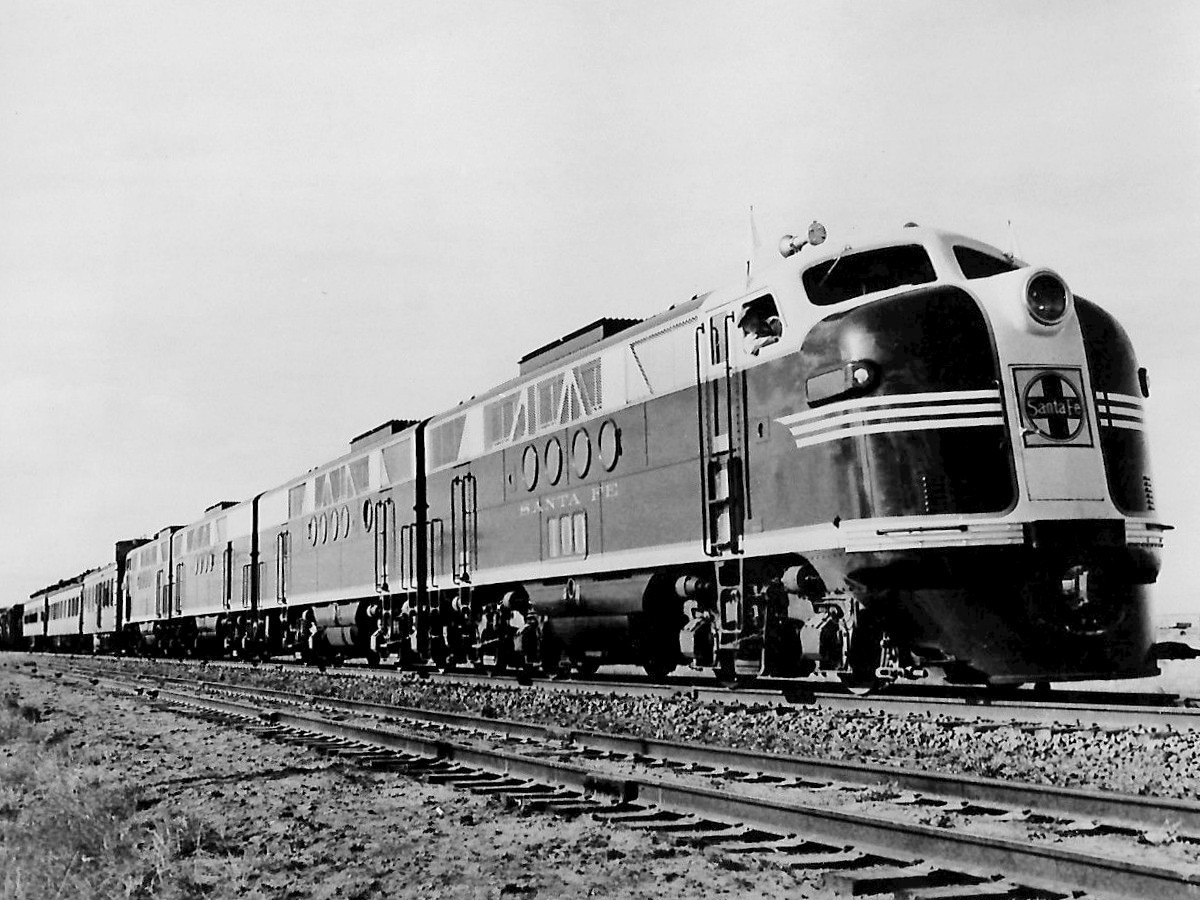
EMD F-unit locomotives were widely used in the early years of dieselisation.

In the early years American railroads imported many steam locomotives from England. While the B&O and the PRR built many of their own steam locomotives, other railroads purchased from independent American manufacturers. Prominent among the early steam manufacturers were Norris, Baldwin and Rogers, followed by Lima and Alco later in the 19th and 20th centuries. The Jeffrey Manufacturing Company of Columbus, Ohio built the first American electric mining locomotive in 1888.

Diesel locomotives were first developed in Europe after World War I, and U.S. railroads began to use them widely in the 1930s and 1940s. Most U.S. railroads discontinued use of steam locomotives by the 1950s. A diesel engine was expensive to build but was less complex and easier to maintain than a steam locomotive, and required only one person to operate. This meant reduced costs and greater reliability for the railroads. Several companies developed fast streamliner trains, such as the Super Chief and the California Zephyr during the 1930s and 1940s. Their locomotives used either diesel or similar internal combustion engine designs.

Though electric railways expanded in Europe, they never reached the same popularity in North America. They were built primarily in the northwest and the northeast beginning in the late 19th century. While some railroads used electric locomotives for both freight and passenger trains, by the end of the 20th century most freight trains were pulled only by diesel locomotives. The Northeast Corridor, the most heavily traveled passenger line in the US, is one of few long lines currently operating with electrification.

=== Signalling and communications ===
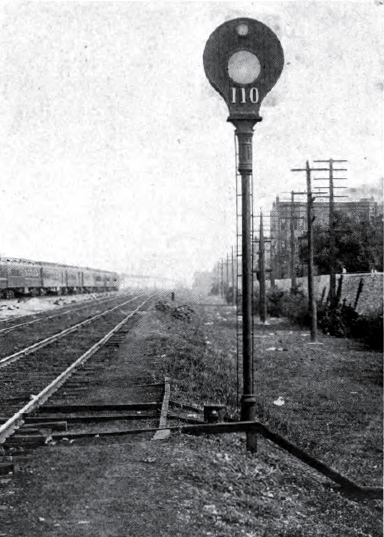
Hall disc signals were used in block signal systems beginning in the 1870s.

Early forms of American railroad signalling and communication were virtually non-existent; the railroads initially managed their train operations using timetables. However, there was no means of timely communication between engineers and dispatchers, and occasionally two trains inadvertently would be sent on a collision course, or "cornfield meet." With the advent of the telegraph in the 1840s, more-sophisticated systems were developed that allowed the dissemination of alterations to the timetable, known as train orders. These orders temporarily overrode the timetable, allowing the rescheduling and cancellation or addition of trains. The earliest recorded use of train orders was by the Erie Railroad in 1851.

The development of the electrical track circuit in the 1870s led to the use of systems of block signals, which improved the railroads' safety, speed and efficiency. Mechanical interlockings, which prevented conflicting movements at rail junctions and crossings, were also introduced in the U.S. in the 1870s, after their initial development in Britain. By the mid-20th century railroads had begun replacing mechanical interlockings with electronic interlocking systems.

The Rail Safety Improvement Act of 2008 strengthened several aspects of railroad safety. Most notable is a requirement for installation of positive train control technology on most of the US railroad network. The technology was operational on all required railroads in 2020.

== Labor relations and worker safety ==
Railways changed employment practices in many ways. Lines with hundreds or thousands of employees developed systematic rules and procedures, not only for running the equipment but in hiring, promoting, paying and supervising employees. The railway system of management was adopted by all major business sectors. Railways offered a new type of work experience in enterprises vastly larger in size, complexity and management. At first workers were recruited from occupations where skills were roughly analogous and transferable, that is, workshop mechanics from the iron, machine and building trades; conductors from stagecoach drivers, steamship stewards and mail boat captains; station masters from commerce and commission agencies; and clerks from government offices.

In response to the strikes of the 1870s and 1880s, Congress passed the Arbitration Act of 1888, which authorized the creation of arbitration panels with the power to investigate the causes of labor disputes and to issue non-binding arbitration awards. The act was a complete failure: only one panel was ever convened under the act, and that one, in the case of the 1894 Pullman Strike, issued its report only after the strike had been crushed by a federal court injunction backed by federal troops.

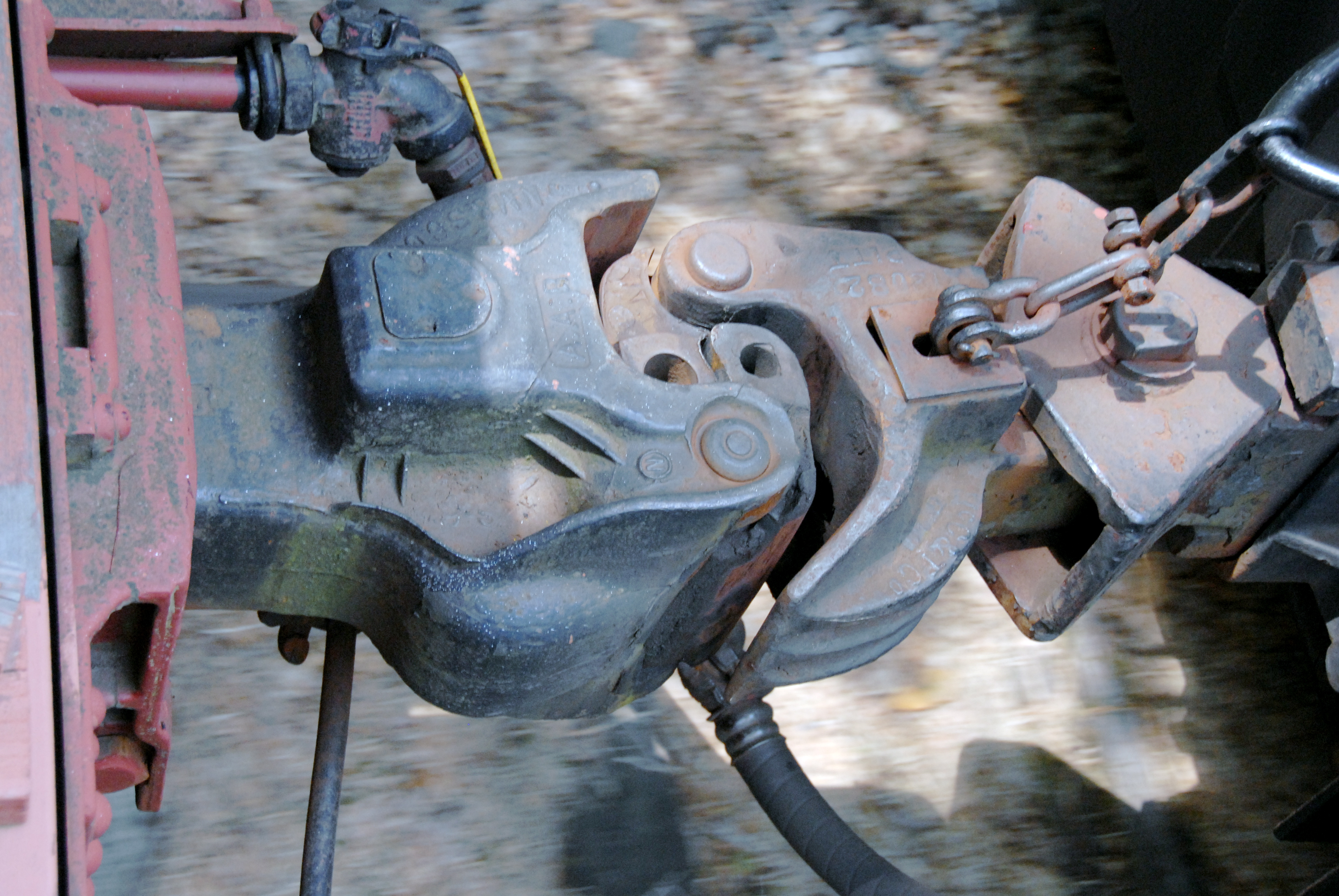
Automatic couplers were required by the 1893 Safety Appliance Act.

Congress attempted to correct these shortcomings in the Erdman Act, passed in 1898. This law likewise provided for voluntary arbitration but made any award issued by the panel binding and enforceable in federal court. It also outlawed discrimination against employees for union activities, prohibited "yellow dog" contracts (employee agrees not to join a union while employed), and required both sides to maintain the status quo during any arbitration proceedings and for three months after an award was issued. The arbitration procedures were rarely used. A successor statute, the Newlands Labor Act, was passed in 1913 and proved more effective but was largely superseded when the federal government nationalized the railroads in 1917.

As railroads expanded after the Civil War, so too did the rate of accidents among railroad personnel, especially brakemen. Many accidents were associated with the coupling and uncoupling of railroad cars and the operation of manually operated brakes (hand brakes). The rise in accidents led to calls for safety legislation as early as the 1870s. In the 1880s, the number of on-the-job fatalities of railroad workers was second only to those of coal miners. Through that decade, several state legislatures enacted safety laws. However, the specific requirements varied among the states, making implementation difficult for interstate rail carriers, and Congress passed the Safety Appliance Act in 1893 to provide a uniform standard. The law required railroads to install air brakes and automatic couplers on all trains, which led to a sharp drop in accidents.

The Esch–Cummins Act of 1920 terminated the nationalization program and created a Railroad Labor Board (RLB) to regulate wages and issue non-binding proposals to settle disputes. In 1921 the RLB ordered a twelve percent reduction in employees' wages, which led to the Great Railroad Strike of 1922, involving rail shop workers nationwide, followed by a court injunction to end the strike. Congress passed the Railway Labor Act of 1926 to rectify the shortcomings of the RLB procedures.

Congress added railroad worker safety laws throughout the 20th century. Significant among this legislation is the Federal Railroad Safety Act of 1970, which gave the FRA broad responsibilities over all aspects of rail safety, and expanded the agency's authority to cover all railroads, both interstate and intrastate.

== Impact on American economy and society ==
The railroad produced as profound a change in the 19th century as electricity did in the 20th century. As historian Chester Wright put it, "Its revolutionizing effects can scarcely be exaggerated." The first transcontinental railroad cut the time it took to get across the country from months down to days. Even more importantly, it cut freight rates down to a small fraction of what they had been with wagon transport.

Water transportation was cheaper than rail but slower, and river routes tended to be more circuitous than rail routes. When rail lines were built, they typically captured virtually all the passenger business and much of the freight business. Water carriers were forced to cut their freight rates in order to preserve market share. All forms of economic activity increased significantly in the 19th century as a result of low-cost rail transportation. As historian George Rogers Taylor put it, “The magnitude of this change was so great as to permit a major revolution in domestic commerce.”

According to historian Henry Adams the system of railroads needed:

the energies of a generation, for it required all the new machinery to be created—capital, banks, mines, furnaces, shops, power-houses, technical knowledge, mechanical population, together with a steady remodelling of social and political habits, ideas, and institutions to fit the new scale and suit the new conditions. The generation between 1865 and 1895 was already mortgaged to the railways, and no one knew it better than the generation itself. The impact can be examined through five aspects: shipping, finance, management, careers, and popular reaction.

=== Shipping freight and passengers ===
Railroads provided a highly efficient network for shipping freight and passengers across a large national market. The result was a transforming impact on most sectors of the economy including manufacturing, retail and wholesale, agriculture and finance. Supplemented with the telegraph that added rapid communications, the U.S. had an integrated national market practically the size of Europe, with no internal barriers or tariffs, all supported by a common language, financial system and legal system. The railroads at first supplemented, then largely replaced the previous transportation modes of turnpikes and canals, rivers and intracoastal ocean traffic. Highly efficient Northern railroads played a major role in winning the Civil War, while the overburdened Southern lines collapsed in the face of an insurmountable challenge.

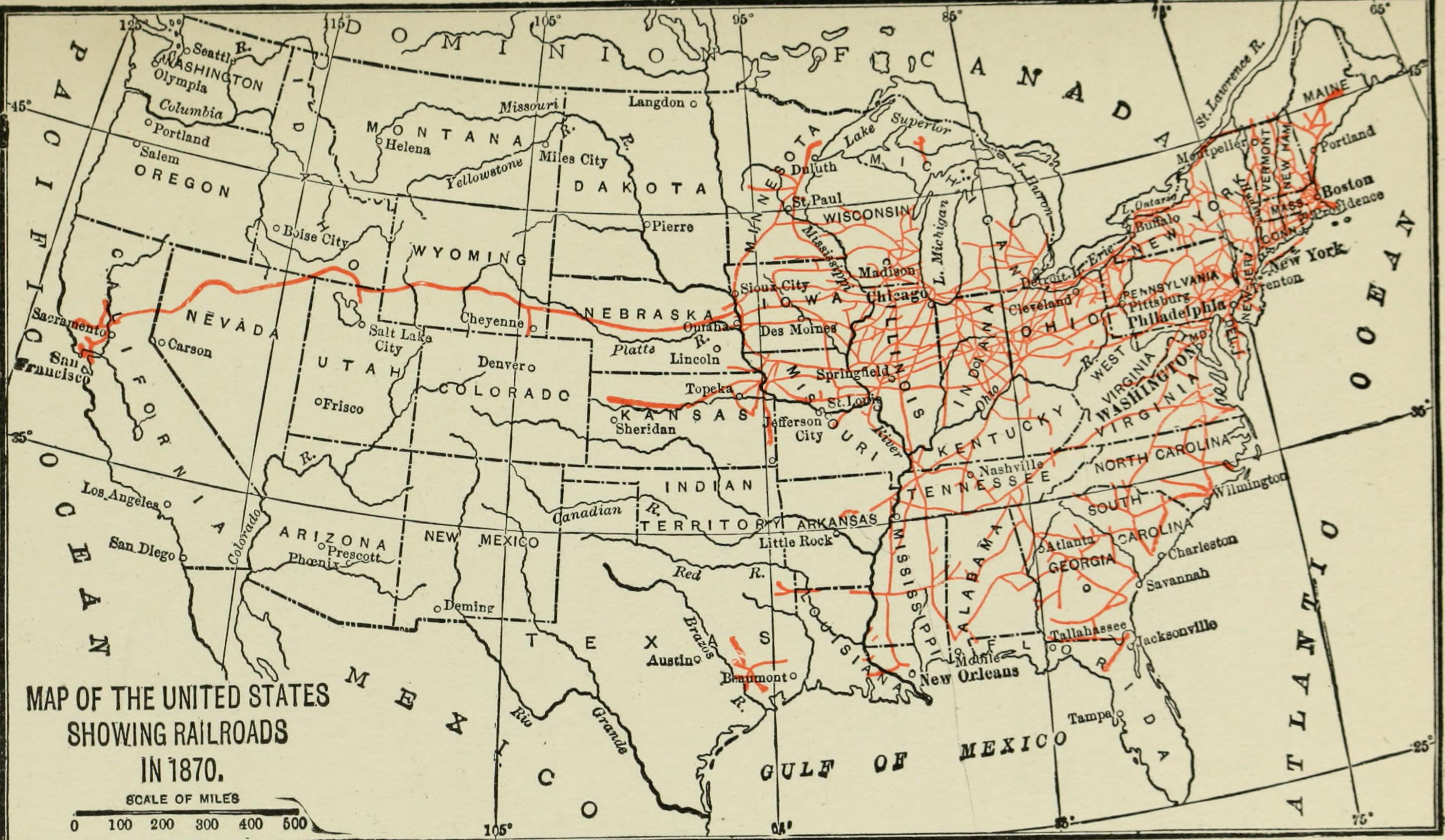
Railroads in the United States in 1870. The map shows the first transcontinental railroad, which was completed in 1869.

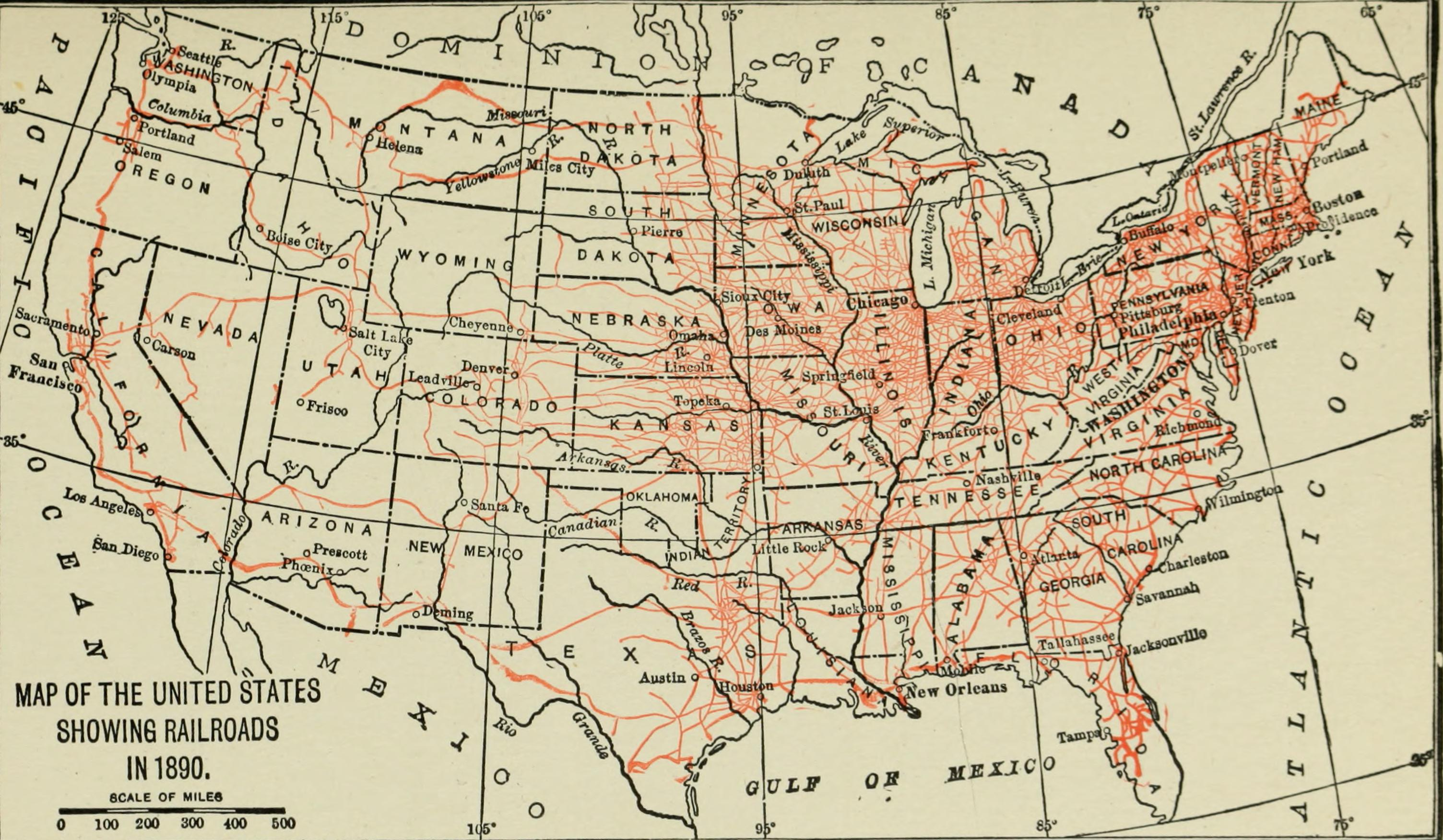
Railroads in the United States in 1890. The low cost of rail transportation, which was a small fraction of what it had been with wagon transport, resulted in a tremendous increase in all types of economic activity (such as farming, mining and ranching), particularly in the West.

Railroads increased the speed of transportation and also dramatically lowered its cost. The first transcontinental railroad resulted in passengers and freight being able to cross the country in a matter of days instead of months and at one tenth the cost of stagecoach or wagon transport. This was particularly significant in the West, which has few navigable rivers. As a result of the tremendous reduction in freight rates that rail transportation provided compared to the high cost of wagon transportation, now farming, ranching and mining could be done at a profit throughout the West. Prior to the Civil War, average rail freight rates were 3 cents per ton-mile (one ton of freight hauled one mile), compared to 15 cents by wagon. Rail freight rates fell even further to less than 1 cent per ton-mile by 1895.

For example, before the railroads were built in the West, if a farmer were to ship a load of corn only 200 miles to Chicago, the cost of shipping it there by wagon would exceed the price for which the corn could be sold. So, under such circumstances, farming was not profitable in most of the West. Mining and other economic activity in the West were similarly inhibited because of the high cost of wagon transportation. One Congressman referring to the West, bluntly stated that "All that land wasn't worth ten cents until the railroads came." The coming of the railroad changed this dramatically. Instantaneously, freight rates dropped to a small fraction of what they had been by wagon. As a result, farming, mining, logging, and ranching could be done at a profit.

Freight rates by rail were a small fraction of what they had been with wagon transport. By 1887, it was calculated that the railroads were hauling a thousand ton-miles of freight for every person in the United States annually, and that if this freight were hauled by wagon, it would cost 20 times as much (and cost more than the entire value of the country's gross national product). When Thomas Jefferson bought the Louisiana Purchase in 1803, people thought it would take 300 years to populate it. With the coming of the railroad, it was accomplished in only 30 years. The low cost of shipping by rail resulted in what had been referred to on maps as the Great American Desert becoming the great American breadbasket.

=== Basis of the private financial system ===
Railroads financing provided the basis of the private (non-governmental) financial system. Construction of railroads was far more expensive than factories or canals. The Erie canal, 300 miles (480 km) long in upstate New York, cost $7 million of state money, which was about what private investors spent on one short railroad in western Massachusetts. A new steamboat on the Hudson, Mississippi, Missouri, or Ohio rivers cost about the same as one mile of track.

In 1860, the combined total of railroad stocks and bonds was $1.8 billion; 1897 it reached $10.6 billion (compared to a total national debt of $1.2 billion). Funding came from financiers throughout the Northeast and from Europe, especially Britain. The federal government provided no cash to any other railroads. However it did provide unoccupied free land to some of the Western railroads, so they could sell it to farmers and have customers along the route. Some cash came from states, or from local governments that use money as a leverage to prevent being bypassed by the main line. The larger sound came from the southern states during the Reconstruction era, as they try to rebuild their destroyed rail system. Some states such as Maine and Texas also made land grants to local railroads; the state total was 49 million acres. The emerging American financial system was based on railroad bonds. Boston was the first center, but New York by 1860 was the dominant financial market. The British invested heavily in railroads around the world, but nowhere more so than the United States; The total came to about $3 billion by 1914. In 1914–1917, they liquidated their American assets to pay for war supplies.

=== Inventing modern management ===
The third dimension was in designing complex managerial systems that could handle far more complicated simultaneous relationships that could be dreamed of by the local factory owner who could patrol every part of his own factory in a matter of hours. Civil engineers became the senior management of railroads. The leading innovators were the Western Railroad of Massachusetts and the Baltimore and Ohio Railroad in the 1840s, the Erie in the 1850s and the Pennsylvania in the 1860s.

After a serious accident, the Western Railroad of Massachusetts put in place a system of responsibility for district managers and dispatchers to keep track of all train movements. Discipline was essential—everyone had to follow the rules exactly to prevent accidents. Decision-making powers had to be distributed to ensure safety and to juggle the complexity of numerous trains running in both directions on a single track, keeping to schedules that could easily be disrupted by weather mechanical breakdowns, washouts or hitting a wandering cow. As the lines grew longer with more and more business originating at dozens of different stations, the Baltimore and Ohio set up more complex system that separated finances from daily operations. The Erie Railroad, faced with growing competition, had to make lower bids for freight movement, and had to know on a daily basis how much each train was costing them. Statistics was the weapon of choice. By the 1860s, the Pennsylvania Railroad—the largest in the world—was making further advances in using bureaucracy under John Edgar Thomson, president 1852–1874. He divided the system into several geographical divisions, which each reported daily to a general superintendent in Philadelphia. All the American railroads copied each other in the new managerial advances, and by the 1870s emerging big businesses in the industrial field likewise copied the railroad model.

=== Career paths ===
The fourth dimension was in management of the workforce, both blue-collar workers and white-collar workers. Railroading became a career in which young men entered at about age 18 to 20, and spent their entire lives usually with the same line. Young men could start working on the tracks, become a fireman, and work his way up to the engineer. The mechanical world of the roundhouses have their own career tracks. A typical career path would see a young man hired at age 18 as a shop laborer, be promoted to skilled mechanic at age 24, brakeman at 25, freight conductor at 27, and passenger conductor at age 57. Women were not hired.

White-collar careers paths likewise were delineated. Educated young men started in clerical or statistical work and moved up to station agents or bureaucrats at the divisional or central headquarters. At each level, they had more and more knowledge experience and human capital. They were very hard to replace, and were virtually guaranteed permanent jobs and provided with insurance and medical care. Hiring, firing and wage rates were set not by the foreman, but by central administrators, in order to minimize favoritism and personality conflicts. Everything was by the book, and increasingly complex set of rules told everyone exactly what they should do it every circumstance, and exactly what their rank and pay would be. Young men who were first hired in the 1840s and 1850s retired from the same railroad 40 or 50 years later. To discourage them from leaving for another company, they were promised pensions when they retired. Indeed, the railroads invented the American pension system.

=== Early attitudes towards railroads ===
Boosters in every city worked feverishly to make sure the railroad came through, knowing their urban dreams depended upon it. The mechanical size, scope and efficiency of the railroads made a profound impression; people would dress in their Sunday best to go down to the terminal to watch the train come in. David Nye argues that:

The startling introduction of railroads into this agricultural society provoked a discussion that soon arrived at the enthusiastic consensus that railways were sublime and that they would help to unify, dignify, expand and enrich the nation. They became part of the public celebrations of Republicanism. The rhetoric, the form, and the central figures of civic ceremonies changed to accommodate the intrusion of this technology... [Between 1828 and 1869] Americans integrated the railroad into the national economy and enfolded it within the sublime.

Travel became much easier, cheaper and more common. Shoppers from small towns could make day trips to big city stores. Hotels, resorts and tourist attractions were built to accommodate the demand. The realization that anyone could buy a ticket for a thousand-mile trip was empowering. Historians Gary Cross and Rick Szostak argue:

with the freedom to travel came a greater sense of national identity and a reduction in regional cultural diversity. Farm children could more easily acquaint themselves with the big city, and easterners could readily visit the West. It is hard to imagine the United States of continental proportions without the railroad.

The engineers became model citizens, bringing their can-do spirit and their systematic work effort to all phases of the economy as well as local and national government. By 1910, major cities were building magnificent palatial railroad stations, including Pennsylvania Station in New York City, and Washington Union Station in Washington D.C.

As early as the 1830s, novelists and poets began fretting that the railroads would destroy the rustic attractions of the American landscape. By the 1840s concerns were rising about terrible accidents when speeding trains crashed into helpless wooden carriages. By the 1870s, railroads were vilified by Western farmers who absorbed the Granger movement theme that monopolistic carriers controlled too much pricing power, and that the state legislatures had to impose maximum prices. Local merchants and shippers supported the demand and got some "Granger Laws" passed. Anti-railroad complaints were loudly repeated in late 19th century political rhetoric. The idea of establishing a strong rate fixing federal body was achieved during the Progressive Era, primarily by a coalition of shipping interests. Railroad historians mark the 1906 Hepburn Act that gave the ICC the power to set maximum railroad rates as a damaging blow to the long-term profitability and growth of railroads. After 1910 the lines faced an emerging trucking industry to compete with for freight, and automobiles and buses to compete for passenger service.

== Environmental history of railways ==
Railways also disrupted the natural tendencies of the environment through an increased capacity for transportation. Railroads throughout the United States allowed quicker, more efficient transport of goods and people that were previously unavailable. Agriculture, animals, soldiers, goods, and natural resources were now able to move large distances in much shorter amounts of time. As a result, things that were not harvested before like certain tracts of arable land or animal populations were now being used.

=== Impact on buffalo population ===
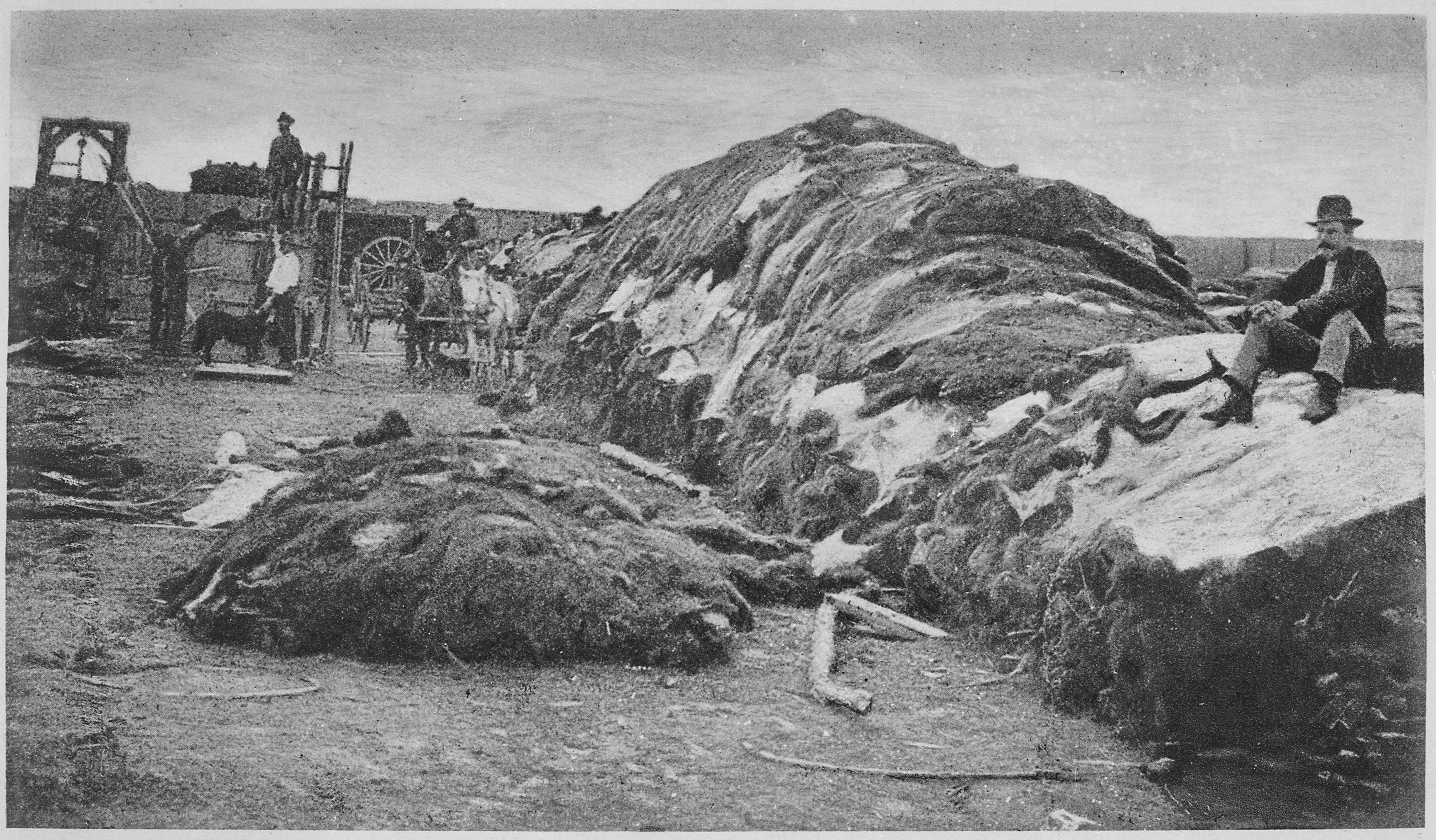
A buffalo hide yard in Dodge City, Kansas, in 1878

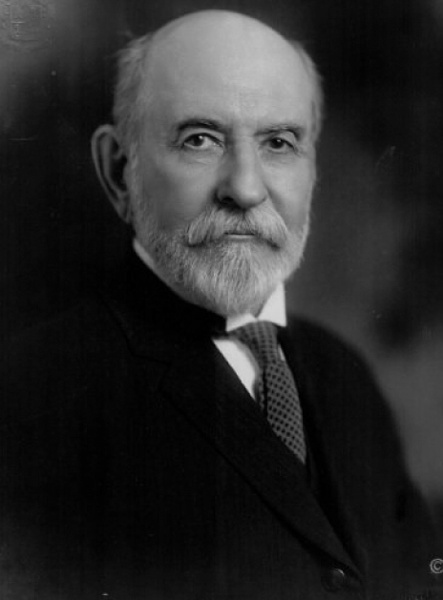
Willam Hornaday, a leading conservationist of the 19th century

During the first half of the 19th century, herds of buffalo were plentiful throughout the Midwestern states of America, but the American people through Manifest Destiny drastically changed the American landscape. Before the Civil War, 8 million buffalo roamed free, but only 4–6 million remained after the war because their hides had become valuable throughout the country and domestic horses and cattle had begun to occupy the same space and graze the same land as the bison. William Hornaday, an influential zoologist and student of the American bison, wrote, "as soon as the railways crossed the buffalo country, the slaughter began." Railroads gave rise to the consumption of buffalo because hunters and businessmen could transport parts of the buffalo to distant parts of the country where demand was high. Before, it was not plausible to commercialize the buffalo because the hide, meat, and bones since it would take so much longer to get to their destination. Since railroads made transportation much quicker, it was now plausible for people to make money off the seemingly endless resource in the plains of the Midwest: the buffalo. So extreme was the mass hunting of buffalo thanks to the new railroads that wolves could not consume all of the carcasses that were left behind.

As a result of the rapidly declining bison population, economic opportunities arose through the creation of jobs. Men acquired jobs hunting and skinning bison on the plains, as well as maintaining railroad infrastructure used to transport the valuable bison hides.

=== Railroads in popular culture ===
The aggressive operation of a locomotive at the imaginary "Pile-up station" by fictional engineer "Joe Smashup" formed the basis of a satire that appeared in US newspapers in and around the year 1855.

== Historiography ==
There is no question about the importance of railroads in American history. Churella finds that back in the 1950s business and economic historians, led by Alfred D. Chandler, Jr. and Robert Fogel, made railroads the centerpiece of advanced historiography. That era has passed as courses on railroad history do not make the curriculum, and the historiography has shifted away from professional historian to the "railfans"—very well informed amateur writers fascinated by the memorabilia, technology and locomotives of the steam era. Looking at the voluminous output of railfan authors, Klein says:

"The vast bulk of this work is devoted to minute descriptions of power, rolling stock, obscure short lines, and technical subjects.... But few address the larger questions of railroad history or place their topic in broader contexts."

The result is a multiplicity of histories of specific railroads, large and small. Typically they deal with standard topics: the builders and their organizational, legislative and financial dealings; colorful construction crews laying down wood ties and steel rail; the development of locomotives and passenger cars; boosters who sought a stop in their little town else it would die; the 1880–1920 golden age of the passenger long-distance travel and local excursions; the steady erosion of passenger service during the automobile age; the freight agent and the small-town depot. They end with the more recent saga of retrenchment, merger, and abandonment. From outside the field of railroad history, academic labor historians now deal with the culture of the workers, strikes, the careers for blue collar and white collar men, and racial discrimination. Academic political historians deal with the Granger, Populist and Progressive attacks, and in federal or state regulation.

== Railroad active mileage by region ==
Source: United States Census Bureau, Report on Transportation Business in the United States at the Eleventh Census 1890, pg. 4.

Railroad Active Mileage by Region
Region	1830	1840	1850	1860	1870	1880	1890
New England (ME, NH, VT, MA, RI, CT)	30	513	2,596	3,644	4,273	5,888	6,718
East (NY, PA, OH, MI, IN, MD, DE, NJ, DC)		1,484	3,740	11,927	18,292	28,155	40,826
South (VA, WV, KY, TN, MS, AL, GA, FL, NC, SC)	10	737	2,082	7,908	10,610	14,458	27,833
Midwest (IL, IA, WI, MO, MN)			46	4,951	11,031	22,213	35,580
South Central (LA, AR, OK/Indian Territory)		21	107	250	331	1,621	5,154
West (ND, SD, NM, WY, MT, ID, UT, TX, AZ, NE, KS, TX, CO, CA, NV, OR, WA)				239	4,578	15,466	47,451
TOTAL U.S.	40	2,755	8,571	28,920	49,168	87,801	163,562

== See also ==
- History of rail transport
- American business history
- Confederate railroads in the American Civil War
- High-speed rail in the United States
- History of rail transport in Canada
- History of rapid transit#North America
- History of the Union Pacific Railroad
- Oldest railroads in North America
- Rail transport in Mexico#History
- Rail transportation in the United States
- Railroad land grants in the United States
- Railroad brotherhoods
  - List of American railway unions
  - Great Railroad Strike of 1877
  - Great Southwest railroad strike of 1886
  - Great Railroad Strike of 1922
  - 1992 United States railroad strike
- Railroads in New England
- Timeline of United States railway history
- Track gauge in the United States
