= American rails =

Former section on the London Stock Exchange

American rails was a special section of the London Stock Exchange where American railroad stocks and bonds were traded.

While in the earlier 19th century American railway bonds were often given to British iron producers in part payment for physical rails, later in the century, and especially after the American Civil War, British capital investment increasingly became a factor in the expansion of American railroads. The London market in American railroad securities was particularly active between 1873 and 1893, and was central to the late-19th-century development of Anglo-American investment banking, including the success of J. S. Morgan & Co. The Economist, the Financial Times, and the New York Times all reported on London trading in American rails.
