= Railroads in New England =

History of rail transportation in the New England region

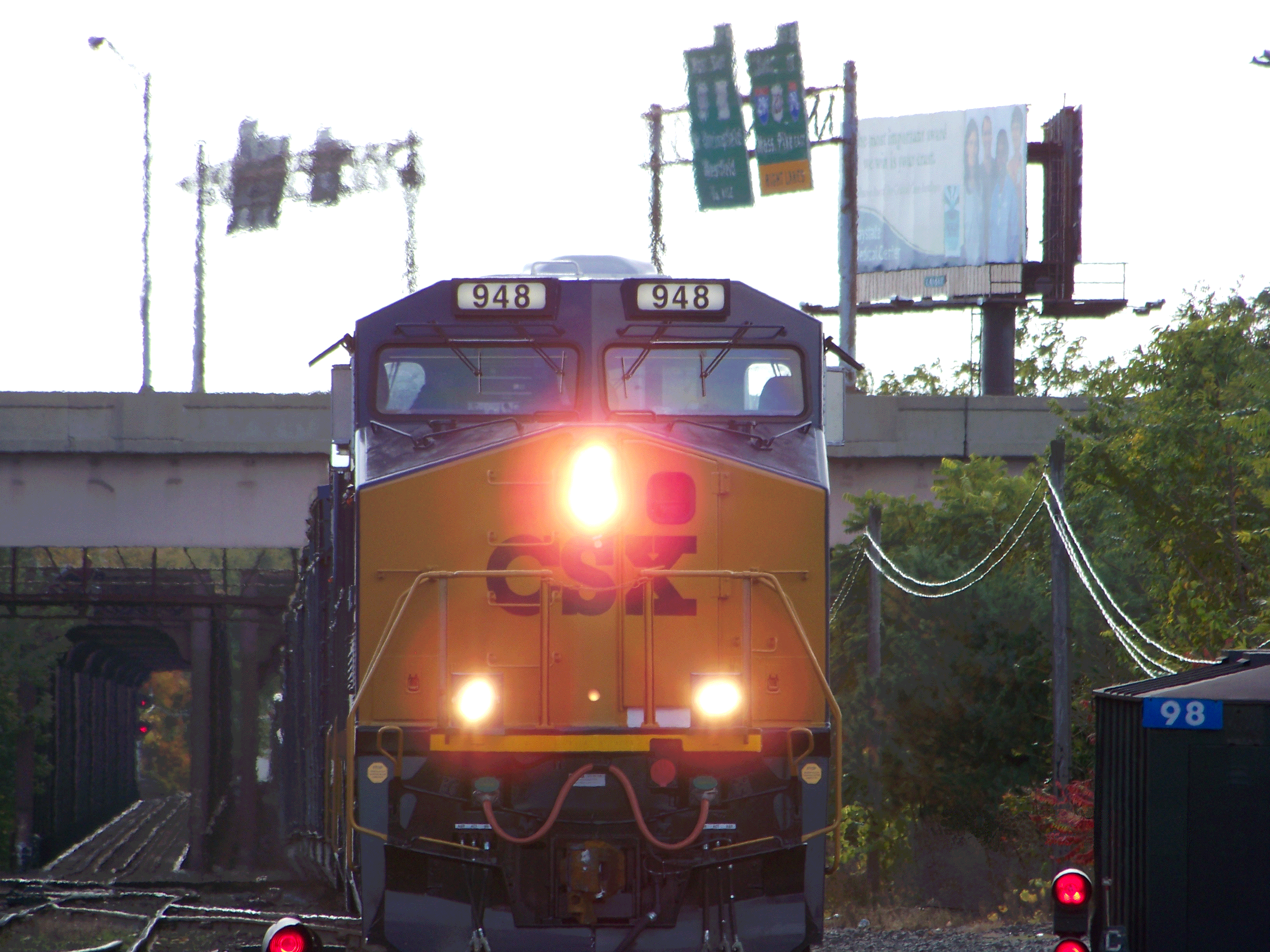
A CSX train in Springfield, Massachusetts along the company's former Boston and Albany Railroad main line between Selkirk, New York and Boston.

Railroads have played an important role in New England ever since the Granite Railway, America's first commercial railway, began operations in Massachusetts in 1826. As industrialization spread across the region, hundreds of railroads were built throughout the 19th century. Railroad mileage peaked around World War I, and from that point on mileage began to shrink. Despite this, railroads continue to be important for freight and passenger transportation in the region, with the New Haven Line holding the title of busiest railroad line in the entire United States.

== Early history (1826–1870) ==
The first modern railway in New England, the Granite Railway was created in Massachusetts to move granite 3 miles downhill from Quincy, Massachusetts to the Neponset River, in support of the construction of the Bunker Hill Monument. Powered by horses and built with wooden rails and stone ties, it was primitive compared to today's railways, but it was soon followed by many others.

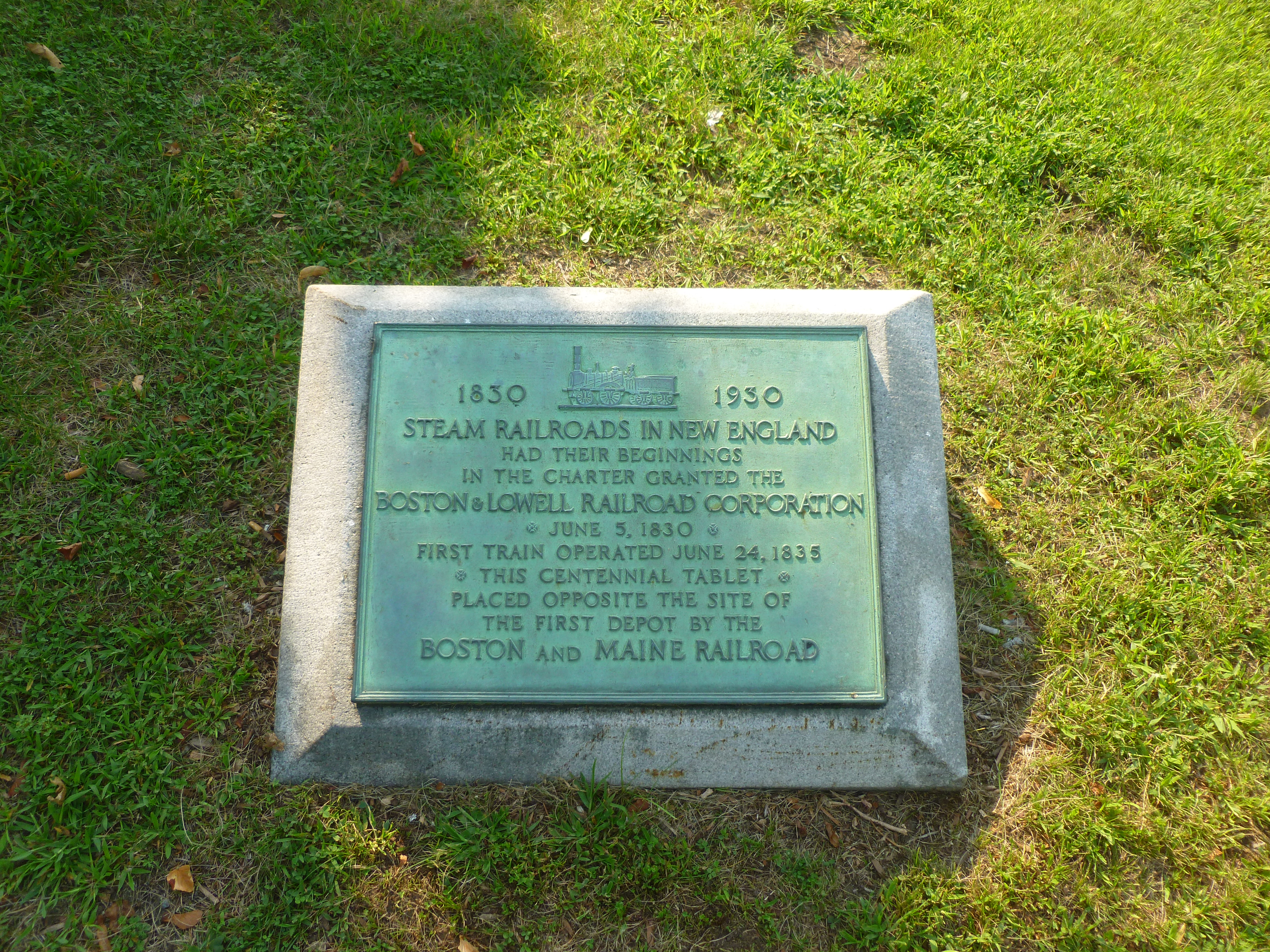
Tablet commemorating centennial of Boston & Lowell Railroad Corporation; Lowell, MA.

New England's first steam powered railroad was the Boston and Lowell Railroad, which was chartered on June 5, 1830, to connect its namesake cities, and opened in 1835 with the region's very first steam locomotives. Hot on the heels of the Boston and Lowell were two other railroads: the Boston and Providence Railroad, chartered in 1831 and opened in 1834; and the Boston and Worcester Rail Road, chartered just one day after the Boston and Providence and opened in April 1834. Together, these three companies were the first three steam railroads in New England. The Boston and Worcester line was extended to Albany, New York by 1841 in an effort to divert freight from the Erie Canal to Boston rather than New York City.

Maine entrepreneur John A. Poor recognized railroads' ability to extend a seaport's commercial control of interior markets, and rivalry soon arose between Boston and Portland, Maine. Maine's first railroad, the Bangor and Piscataquis Railroad, was chartered in 1832, and ran its first train on November 30, 1836. Poor organized the Portland Company to build Portland gauge locomotives for a rail system to compete with the Boston gauge railways. His efforts resulted in Portland being selected as the seaport for the Canadian transcontinental Grand Trunk Railway in 1845.

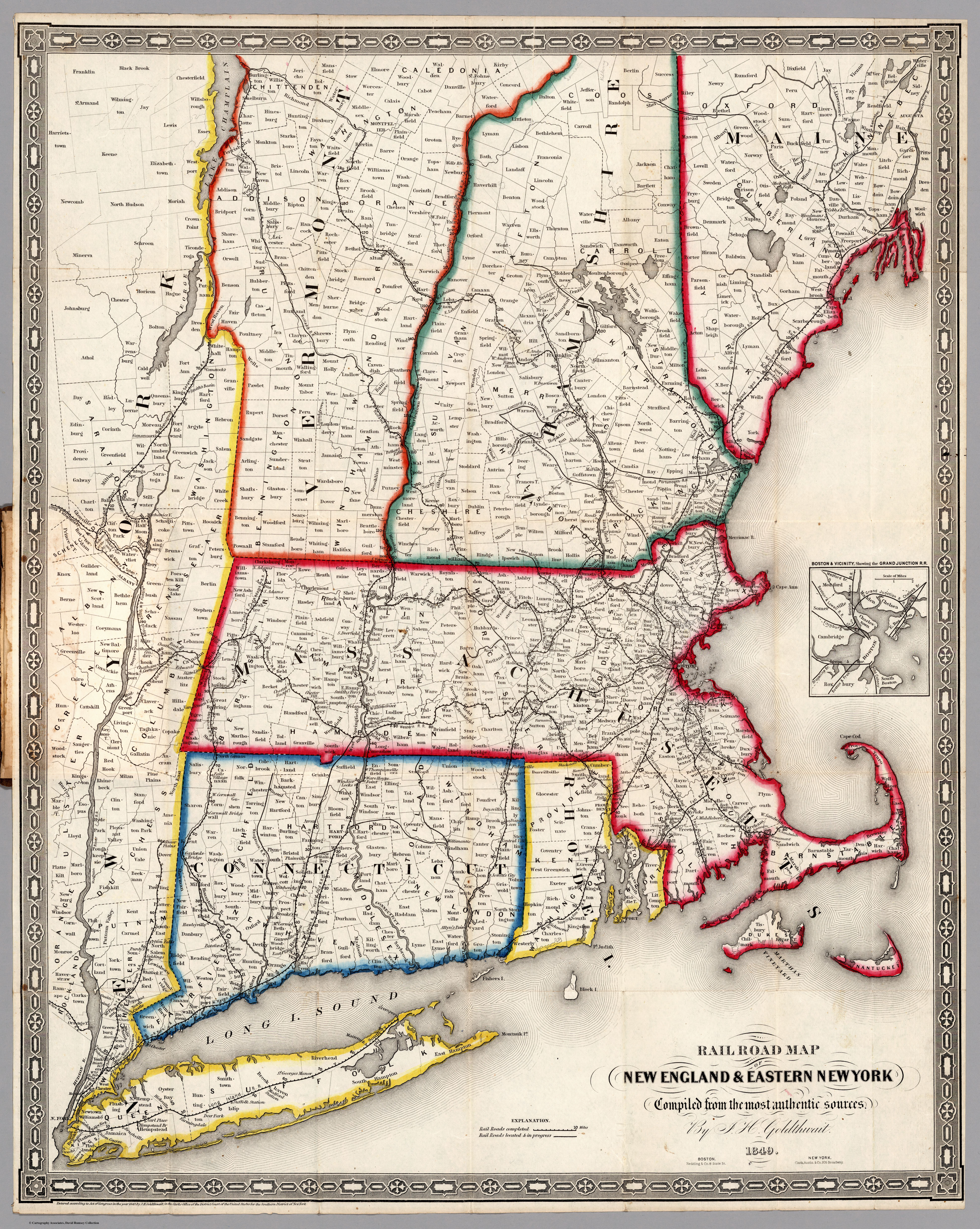
1849 Railroad Map of New England & Eastern New York

The first railroad in Connecticut was the New York and Stonington Railroad, which was chartered in May 1832 and began construction in 1833. Rhode Island gained its first railroad company the next month in the New York, Providence and Boston Railroad. The two companies merged under the latter name the next year, before either was completed. The combined company ran its first train on November 10, 1837. Railroads first came to New Hampshire via the Nashua and Lowell Railroad, chartered on June 23, 1835, by the state to connect Nashua to the Boston and Lowell.

The final New England state without a railroad, Vermont, gained its first when the Vermont Central Railroad was chartered in 1843.

In the year 1850, no less than half of the railroad mileage in the United States was within New England. Entering the second half of the 19th century, many smaller companies merged or were absorbed by others.

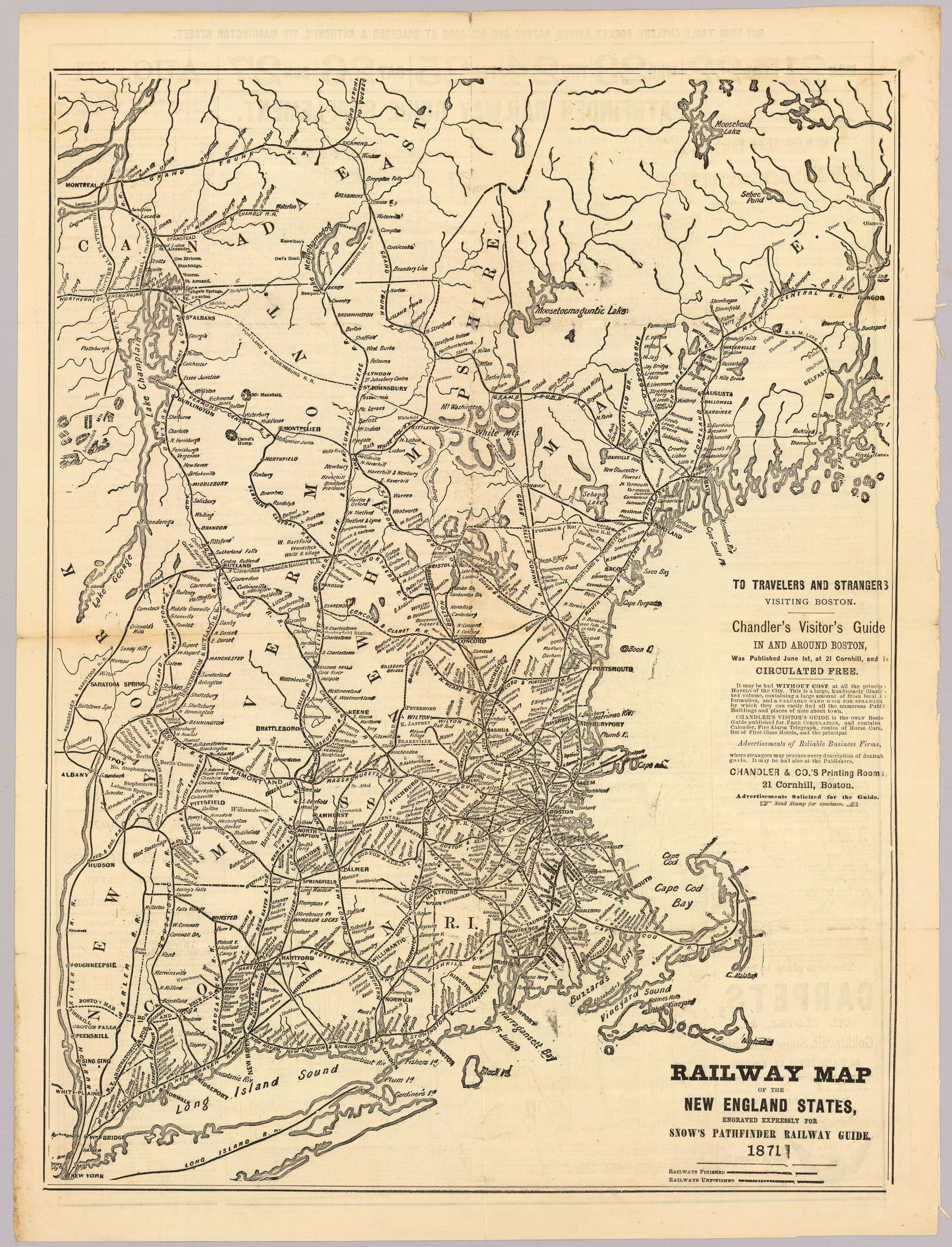
A map of New England railroads in 1871.

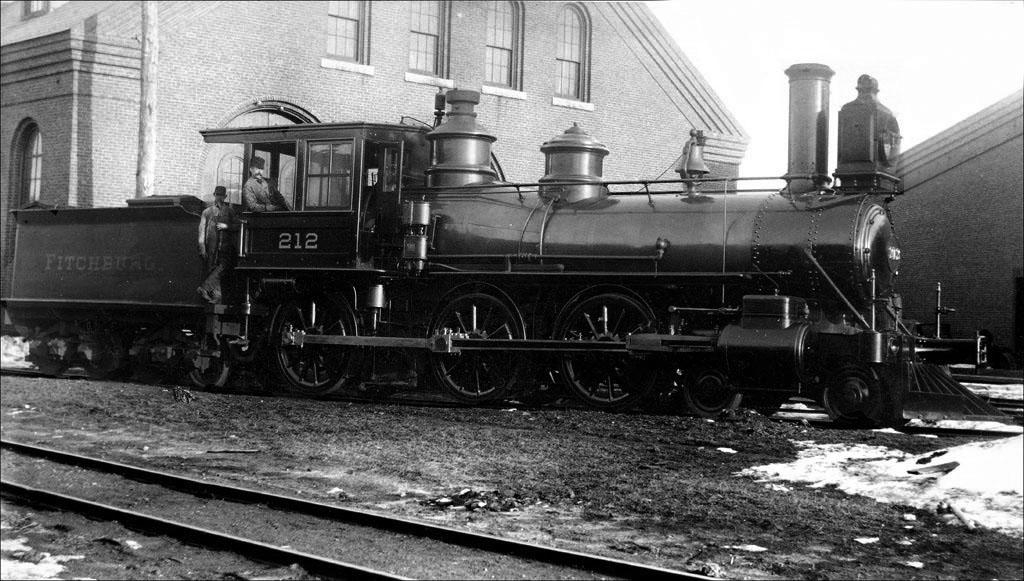
A locomotive of the Fitchburg Railroad in the mid to late 1800s. This company was absorbed by the Boston and Maine in 1900.

== Consolidation (1870–1917) ==
The Maine Central had converted its Portland gauge lines to standard gauge by 1871, and the Grand Trunk Railway from Portland to Montreal was standard gauged overnight on 26 September 1874.

1872 saw the formation of the New York, New Haven and Hartford Railroad, created by the merger of the New York and New Haven and the Hartford and New Haven. The New Haven began to acquire various other railroads in southern New England over the next decades.

By 1875, over 100 different railroad companies had been formed and built railroad lines since the Boston and Lowell. In a drive for efficiency and power, several companies began a process of consolidation that saw most small railroads absorbed by a small number of larger operators. The three primary culprits behind this trend were the Boston and Maine, the New Haven, and the Maine Central. In more sparsely populated Northern New England, a number of smaller companies maintained their independence through this time, such as the Bangor and Aroostook, the Rutland Railroad, and the Grand Trunk Railway.

In the final decades of the 1800s, the New Haven rapidly expanded by leasing or purchasing other railroads, to the point it had a near complete monopoly on rail transportation in Connecticut, Rhode Island, and southern Massachusetts. The only railroad more than a few miles long to remain independent of the NYNH&H in the southern two states was the Central Vermont Railway, protected from a New Haven acquisition by parent Grand Trunk Railway.

The Boston and Maine similarly swallowed up a number of smaller railroads in central New England during this time period, such as the Boston and Lowell, the Connecticut River Railroad, and the Northern Railroad. In 1900, the New York Central Railroad leased the Boston and Albany Railroad, though it continued to operate as a subsidiary.

== The World Wars and the Great Depression (1917–1945) ==
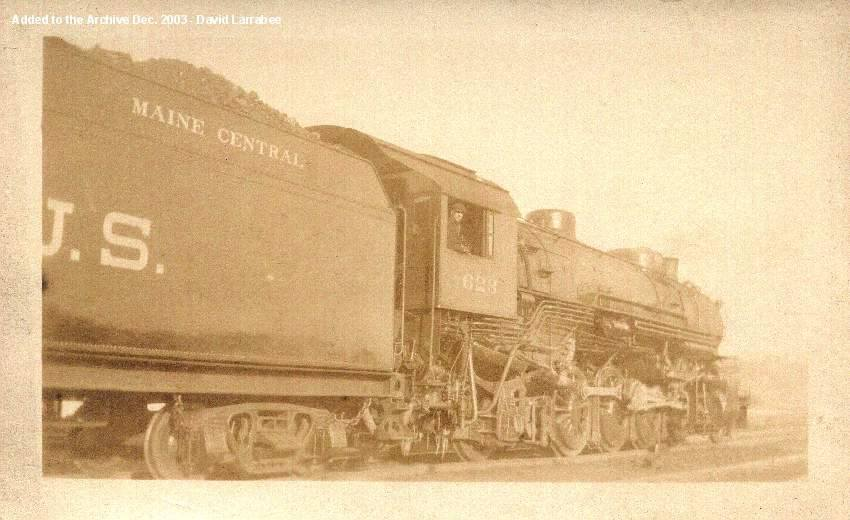
This Maine Central locomotive pictured in 1919, a USRA Light Mikado, was built during nationalization.

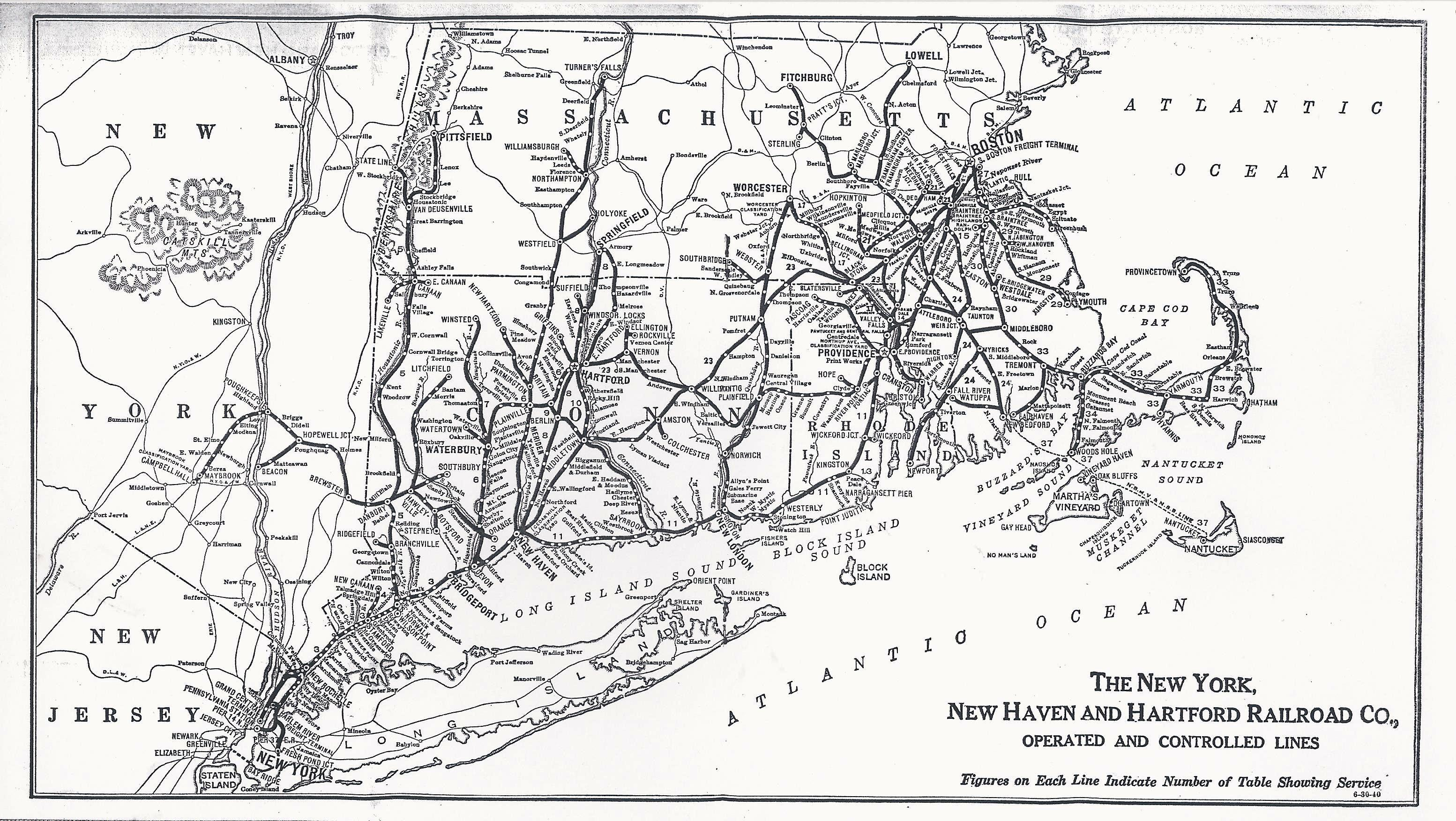
By the dawn of World War II, the New Haven Railroad dominated rail traffic in southern New England, as shown in this 1940 map.

The entire United States railroad system was nationalized by the federal government under the United States Railroad Administration on December 28, 1917, shortly after the country's entry into World War I. New England's railroads were returned to their previous owners on March 1, 1920, when the USRA was disbanded. While nationalization lasted less than three years, the short period of government control brought extensive investment into railroad infrastructure across the nation, including in New England. The nationalized system resulted in thousands of new USRA standard locomotives and freight cars being built, which passed to private companies at the end of nationalization. Investment was also made in railroad tracks and yards: an example of this was the major expansion of Cedar Hill Yard between 1917 and 1920 – before nationalization, the New Haven allocated $10 million to the expansion project. Upon government takeover, the USRA doubled the project's budget to $20 million.

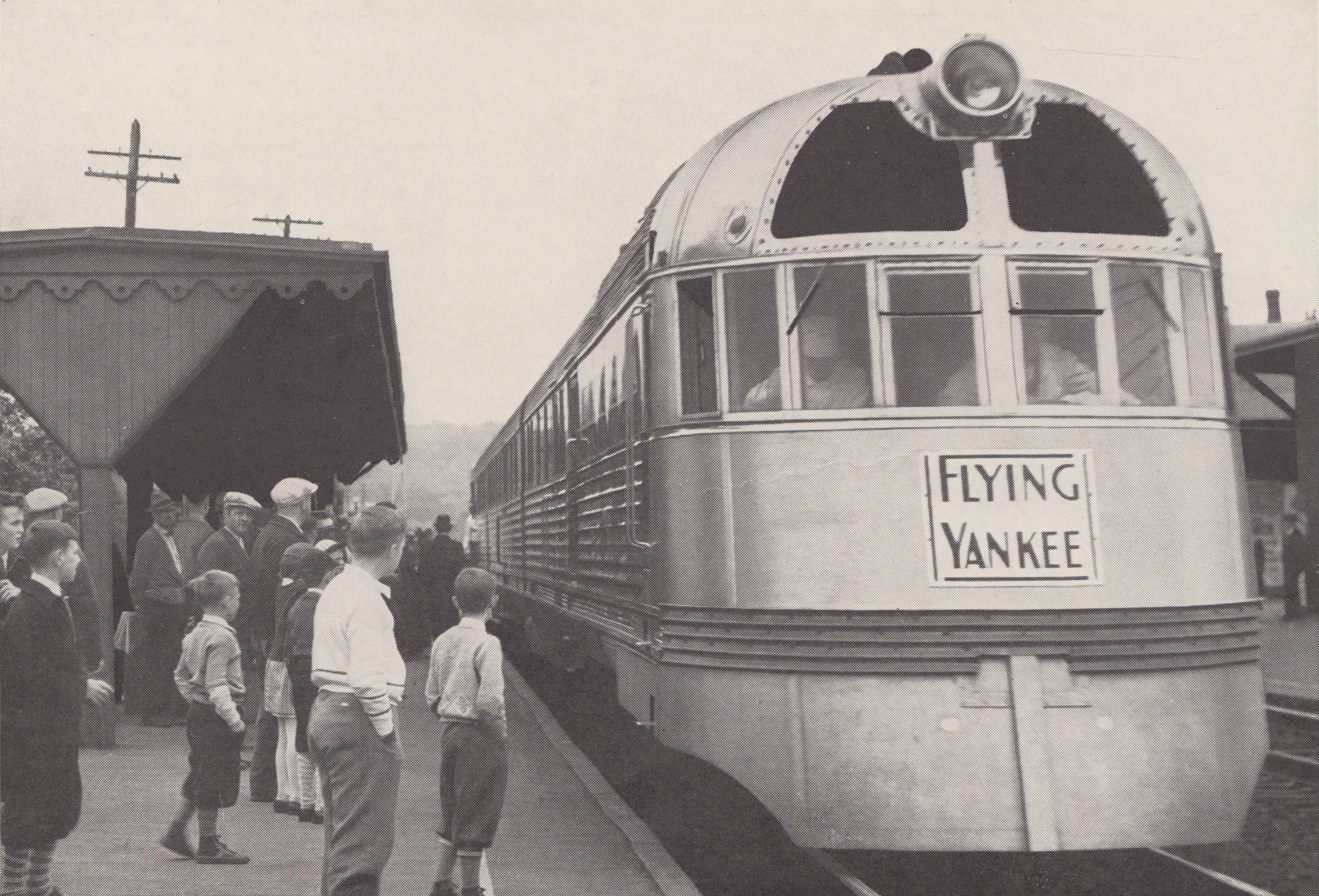
The Boston and Maine's Flying Yankee, built in 1935, was one of America's first streamliners.

The war saw the peak of United States rail mileage, with a total of 254,000 route miles. After the war, railroad mileage in New England began to shrink, in line with national trends.

With the bankruptcy of the Grand Trunk system in the early 1920s the line from Portland to Montreal was nationalized as the Berlin subdivision of the Canadian National Railway in 1923. As the Canadian government subsidized longer alternative routes to Halifax, Nova Scotia, annual export tonnage out of Portland declined from 600,000 tons to 21,000 tons over the following decade. Like the rest of the country, New England was hit hard by the Great Depression in 1929. The New Haven went bankrupt in 1935, due to significant debt largely brought about by the effects of the depression. Under pressure by reduced traffic to cut costs, many redundant or low-traffic lines were abandoned during and shortly after the depression. Some notable abandonments included most of the Central New England Railway in 1938, the New Haven and Derby Railroad between 1939 and 1941, and the entirety of the Boston, Revere Beach and Lynn Railroad in 1940.

== Bankruptcies and decline (1945-1970) ==
After World War II, railroads in New England faced strong competition from automobiles, aircraft, and trucks. Being a relatively compact region, New England railroads could not rely on rail transportation's advantages over other modes of transportation over longer distances. Beginning in the 60s, many of the region's largest railroads went bankrupt, starting with the New Haven in July 1961. After nearly a decade of financial troubles, the Interstate Commerce Commission forced the newly formed Penn Central Transportation Company to take over the New Haven's operations on December 31, 1968. Already a troubled merger, the addition of the New Haven's lines brought Penn Central to bankruptcy in 1970. The Boston and Maine fared little better than its southern counterparts, declaring bankruptcy the same year as Penn Central. The Rutland Railroad shut down in 1963, with the state of Vermont purchasing most of its lines to prevent them from being abandoned.

== Amtrak, Conrail, and the rise of short lines (1970–1999) ==
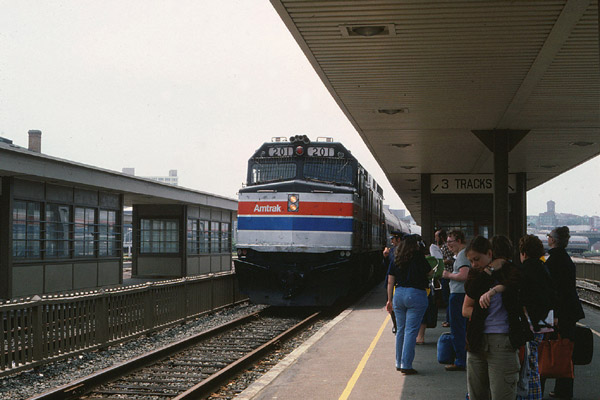
An Amtrak train in Providence, Rhode Island

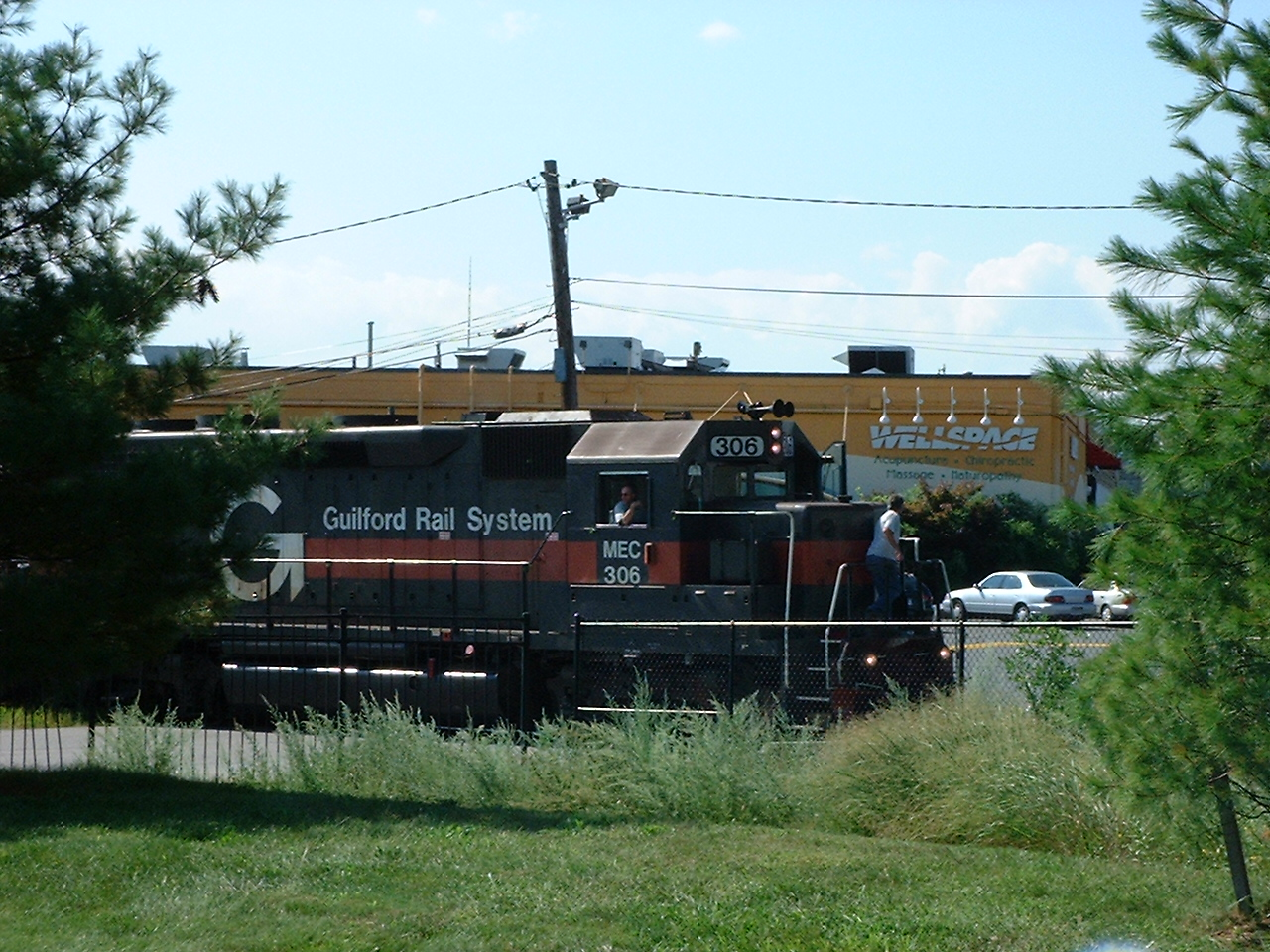
A Guilford locomotive in 2001, bearing Maine Central reporting marks.

Concerned by the precipitous decline of railroads in the Northeastern United States, the federal government responded by creating the Consolidated Rail Corporation (Conrail) in 1976. The new company inherited the lines of Penn Central with an agenda to turn around several decades of decline, neglect, and unprofitable operations. Despite also being bankrupt, the B&M opted out of inclusion within Conrail and continued as an independent company.

Conrail's first years were marked by unprofitability, along with the abandonment of many lines. A number of Conrail lines were saved from abandonment by being sold to shortline railroads such as the Pioneer Valley Railroad, the Bay Colony Railroad, and the Connecticut Southern Railroad, which could operate more marginal routes at a profit thanks to their smaller size and more flexible operations.

Pan Am Railways, originally known as Guilford, was formed in 1981 by Timothy Mellon. Mellon's new company purchased the Maine Central in 1981, the Boston & Maine in 1983, and the Delaware and Hudson in 1984. The company also took control of a number of routes that Conrail wished to sell. With these purchases, Guilford became the largest railroad in New England. This was not for long however, as the company struggled with unprofitable lines and disputes with labor, leading to many lines being abandoned. By 1988, half of the Maine Central's lines were abandoned.

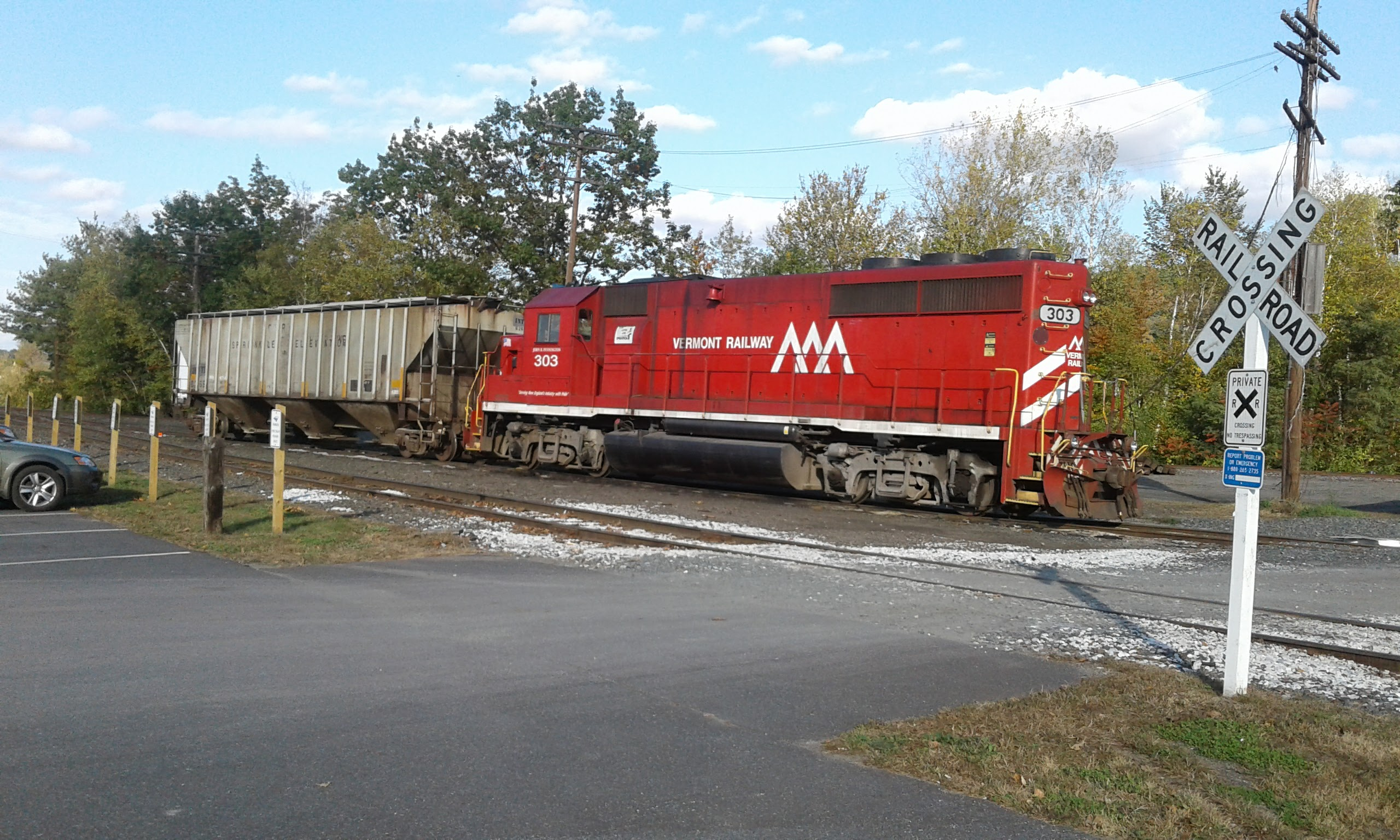
Today, Vermont Railway is the largest railroad in Vermont.

=== States begin to purchase rail lines ===
The state governments of New England began to get directly involved in supporting and preserving rail service, in some cases purchasing railroad lines outright to save them from abandonment, convert them to rail trails, or to allow for upgrades. In 1971, the state of Connecticut leased its portion of the New Haven Line from Penn Central, along with its three branches, before purchasing it outright in 1985. Massachusetts purchased a number of railroad lines from freight operators for commuter rail service under the MBTA, beginning in the 1970s.

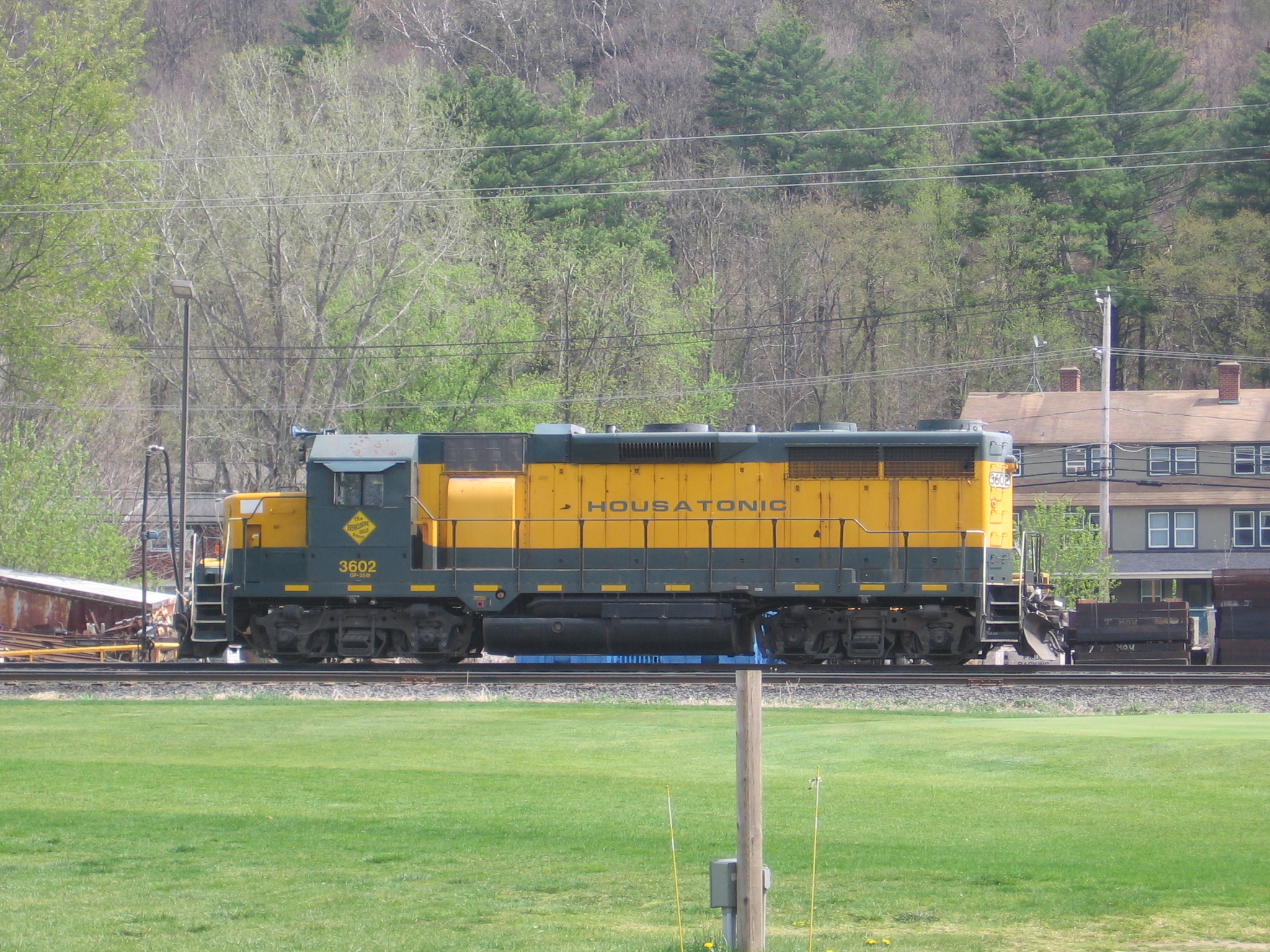
The Housatonic Railroad is one of many shortlines that were created to operate lines spun off from Penn Central or Conrail.

Several railroad lines mismanaged and abandoned by Guilford were purchased by states to preserve their use: in Connecticut, two abandoned Guilford lines were bought by the state and went to the Central New England Railroad in 1995, and another to the Naugatuck Railroad in 1996. Maine purchased the Rockland Branch and a branch between Brewer and Calais in 1987 when Guilford abandoned them, followed by the Mountain Division in 1994.

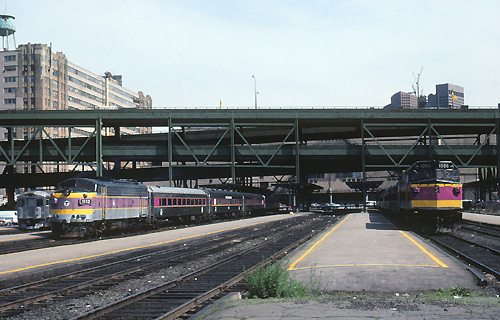
The MBTA began to assume the operation of commuter rail services in and around Boston in the 1970s. MBTA trains are pictured here at North Station in 1988.

=== Passenger rail ===
Most passenger rail service was assumed by federally created Amtrak in 1971, although Penn Central continued to operate some commuter rail service in the Boston region and along the Northeast Corridor.

Amtrak launched two new trains in the 1990s, including the Vermonter in 1995, and the Ethan Allen Express in 1996.

=== Heritage railroads ===
In light of the quickening pace of abandonments across New England, a number of organizations formed to preserve railroad lines and commemorate railroad history. A few examples are the Valley Railroad, formed in 1971; the Conway Scenic Railroad, formed in 1974; the Hobo Railroad, which began in 1986; and the Naugatuck Railroad, which started operations in 1996.

== Passenger rail improvements, CSX, shortline consolidation (1999–present) ==
All of Conrail's trackage within New England was purchased by CSX Transportation as part of the breakup of Conrail in 1999. CSX became the new operator of Conrail's main line between Boston and Albany across southern Massachusetts, along with Cedar Hill Yard in New Haven, Connecticut.

=== The rise of shortline holding companies ===
The numerous shortline railroad operators that originated the demise of Penn Central and spinoffs from Conrail began to be acquired by shortline holding companies such as RailAmerica, Genesee & Wyoming, and Pinsly Railroad Company. G&W purchased RailAmerica in 2012, and has since expanded in New England with the purchase of the Providence and Worcester Railroad in 2016. As of 2021, G&W is designated as the proposed operator of the Berkshire and Eastern Railroad. Some regional and shortline railroads remain independent as of 2021, such as the Housatonic Railroad and Vermont Railway.

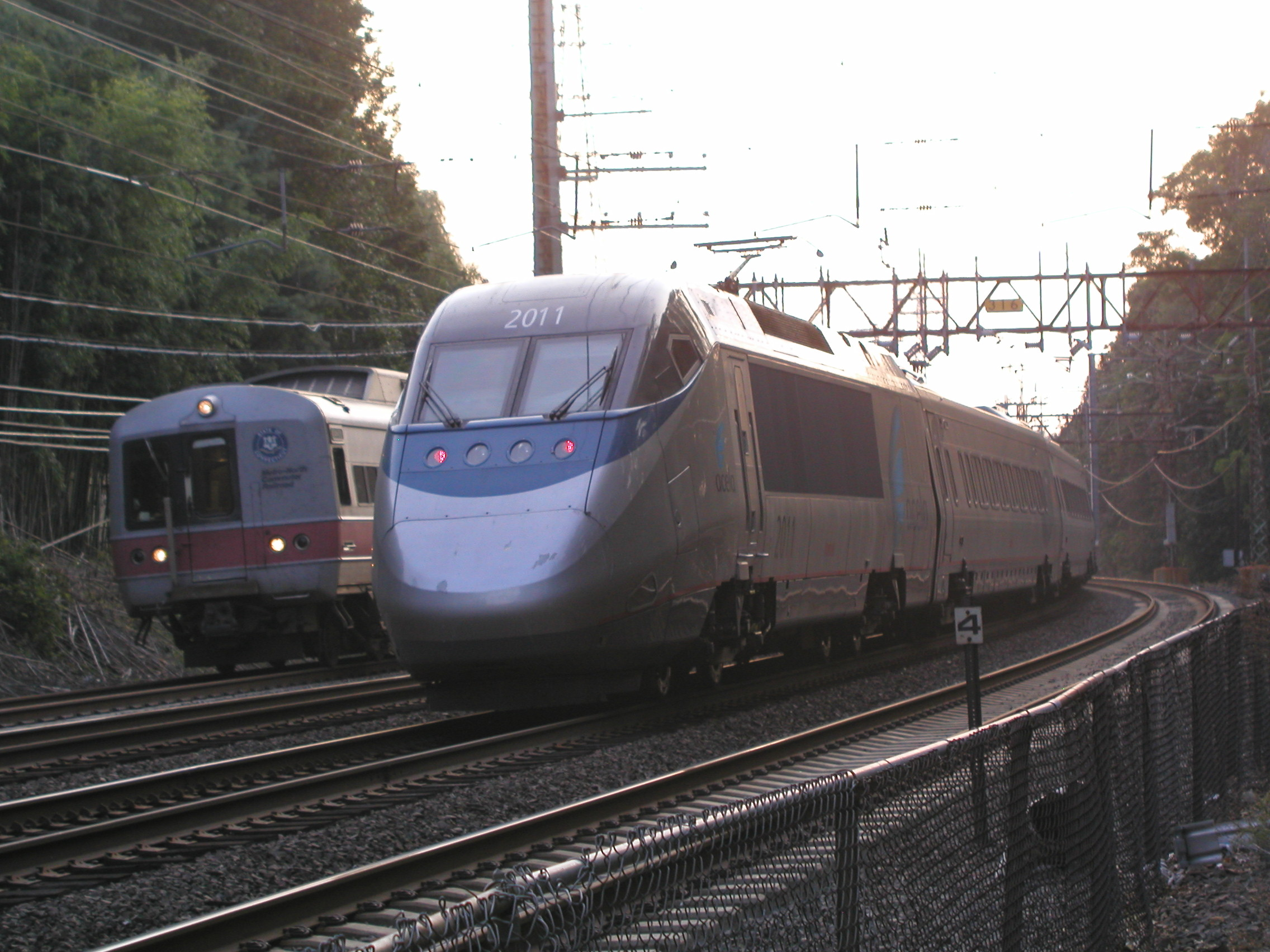
Amtrak's Acela is the first high-speed rail service in the United States. Also pictured is a Metro-North commuter train.

=== Passenger rail expansions ===
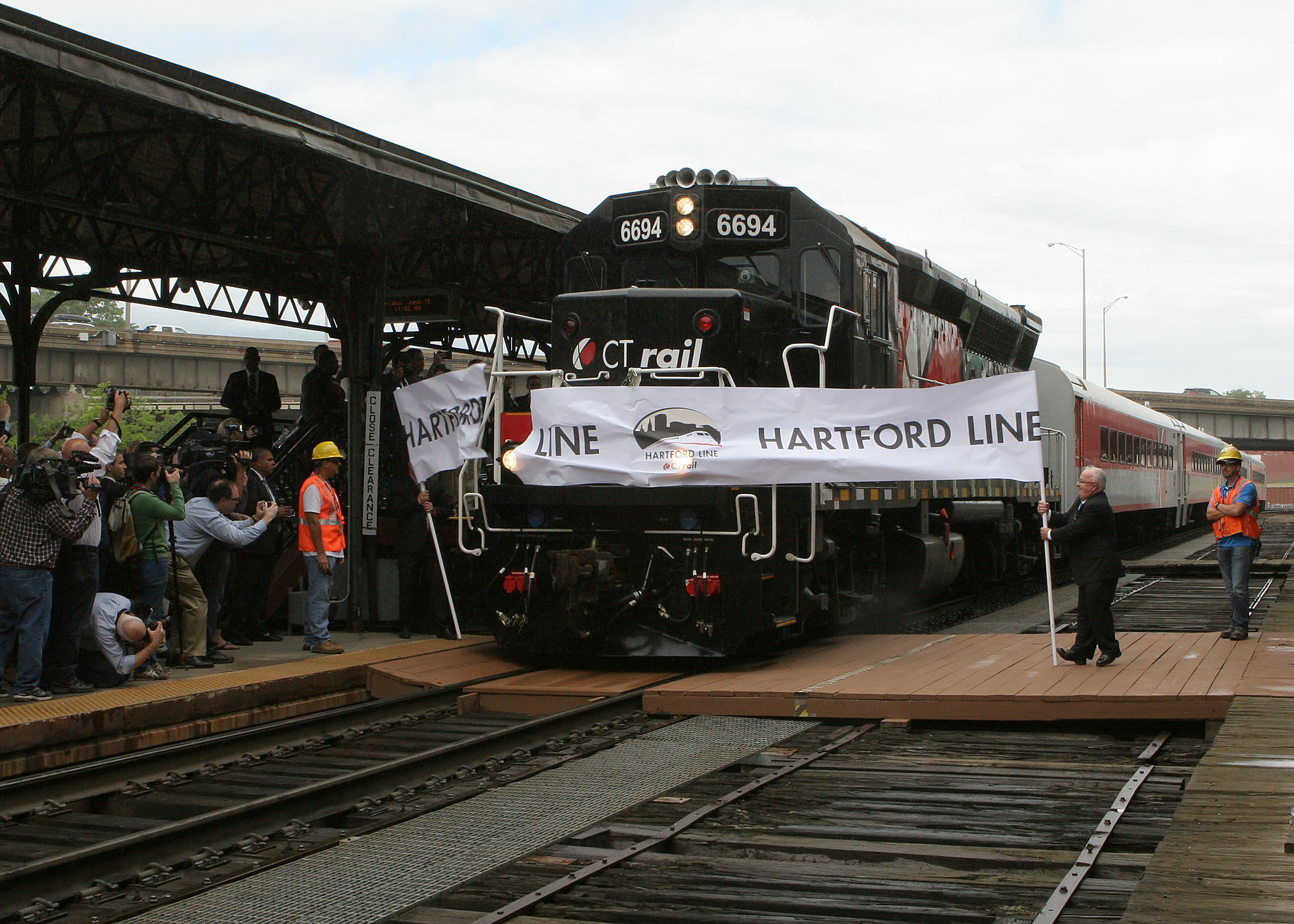
The Hartford Line made its first run on June 15, 2018.

The new millennium has seen several new or expanded passenger services in the region, most under the behest of Amtrak. A significant development was the launch of Acela high speed rail service along the Northeast Corridor between Washington, D.C. and Boston, following the completion of an electrification project between New Haven and Boston in 2000.

The Downeaster was launched in 2001 and returned passenger rail service to Maine. It was one of several state-supported services created by Amtrak and financially subsidized by the states of New England. Other examples include the Amtrak Hartford Line, launched in 2018, which complements the state of Connecticut's identically named Hartford Line service, and the Valley Flyer, launched in 2019 to extend passenger service on the New Haven–Springfield Line northwards from its previous Springfield terminus to Greenfield, Massachusetts.

== Track gauge ==
Ever since the Boston and Lowell railroad was built in the 1830s, the vast majority of railroads in New England have been standard-gauge; though a few early lines were broad-gauge, all were converted to standard-gauge by the end of the 1870s. However, a number of 2 foot narrow-gauge railroads existed in Maine and New Hampshire between the 1870s and 1940s. These are commemorated by a few museums, such as the Maine Narrow Gauge Railroad Museum. One notable exception is the Mount Washington Cog Railway, which is built to 4 ft 8 inches gauge, half an inch less than standard gauge. Today, other than heritage railways, all railroads in New England are standard gauge.
