= Nashua and Lowell Railroad =

Defunct railroad in Massachusetts and New Hampshire

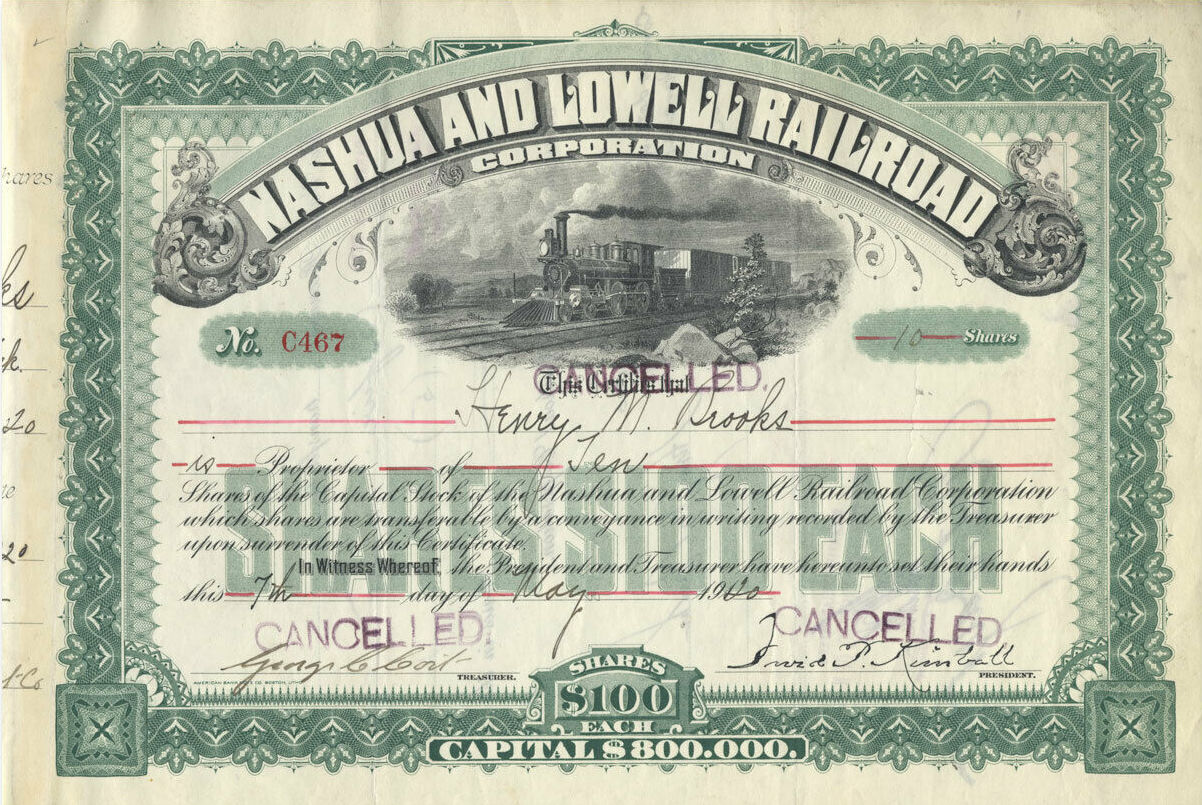
- A stock certificate of the Nashua and Lowell Railroad.

Overview
- Current operator: Pan Am Railways
- Stations called at: 8
- Dates of operation: 1838–1880 (independent operations); 1880–1944 (as a corporate entity)
- Successor: Boston and Lowell Railroad

Technical
- Track gauge: 4 ft 8 1/2 in (1,435 mm) standard gauge
- Length: 14 miles (23 km)

The Nashua and Lowell Railroad (N&L) was a 14-mile-long (23 km) railroad built to connect Nashua, New Hampshire with the city of Lowell, Massachusetts. Chartered in June 1835, construction began in 1837 and the first train ran the next year. The Nashua and Lowell was the first railroad built in the state of New Hampshire.

The company was quickly successful, with large volumes of freight and passengers traveling its line; as a result, the route was double tracked in 1848. Operations were run jointly with the Boston and Lowell Railroad (B&L) from 1857 to 1878 as a railroad pool. Following the dissolution of this agreement, the N&L returned to independent operations until 1880, when the Boston and Lowell Railroad leased the entire line. The Boston and Lowell was in turn leased by the Boston and Maine Railroad (B&M) in 1887; the Nashua and Lowell continued to exist on paper until it was formally purchased by the B&M in 1944. Though the company no longer exists, its line is part of B&M successor Pan Am Railways as of 2021.

== History ==
=== Formation and construction ===
A railroad connecting Nashua, New Hampshire to the city of Lowell, Massachusetts was first considered almost as soon as the Boston and Lowell Railroad reached the latter city in 1835. The textile industry in Nashua, 14 miles (23 km) from Lowell, was rapidly growing, fueling demand for a railroad to be built. In June of that year, several citizens of Nashua were able to obtain a charter from the state of New Hampshire authorizing construction of a railroad from Nashua to the Massachusetts border, a distance of 5 miles (8 km). A corresponding charter from the state of Massachusetts for the rest of the distance to Lowell was first requested from that state's legislature in September 1835, but was not granted at that time. The railroad's backers convinced the Massachusetts legislature to grant a charter for the remaining 9 miles (14 km) to Lowell in April 1836.

Construction was greatly aided by level terrain: the steepest slope on the entire route was a change in elevation of 20 feet (6 m) over a mile. Railroad proponents said of the route that "nature seems to have prepared us a bed for our Rail Road already graded." Construction was completed in late 1838 at a total cost of $380,000 (equivalent to $11,220,688 in 2024). The Nashua Daily Telegraph commented that the gathering of the requisite funds for the railroad's construction "was at that time a matter calling for ... real financial courage."

=== Operations ===
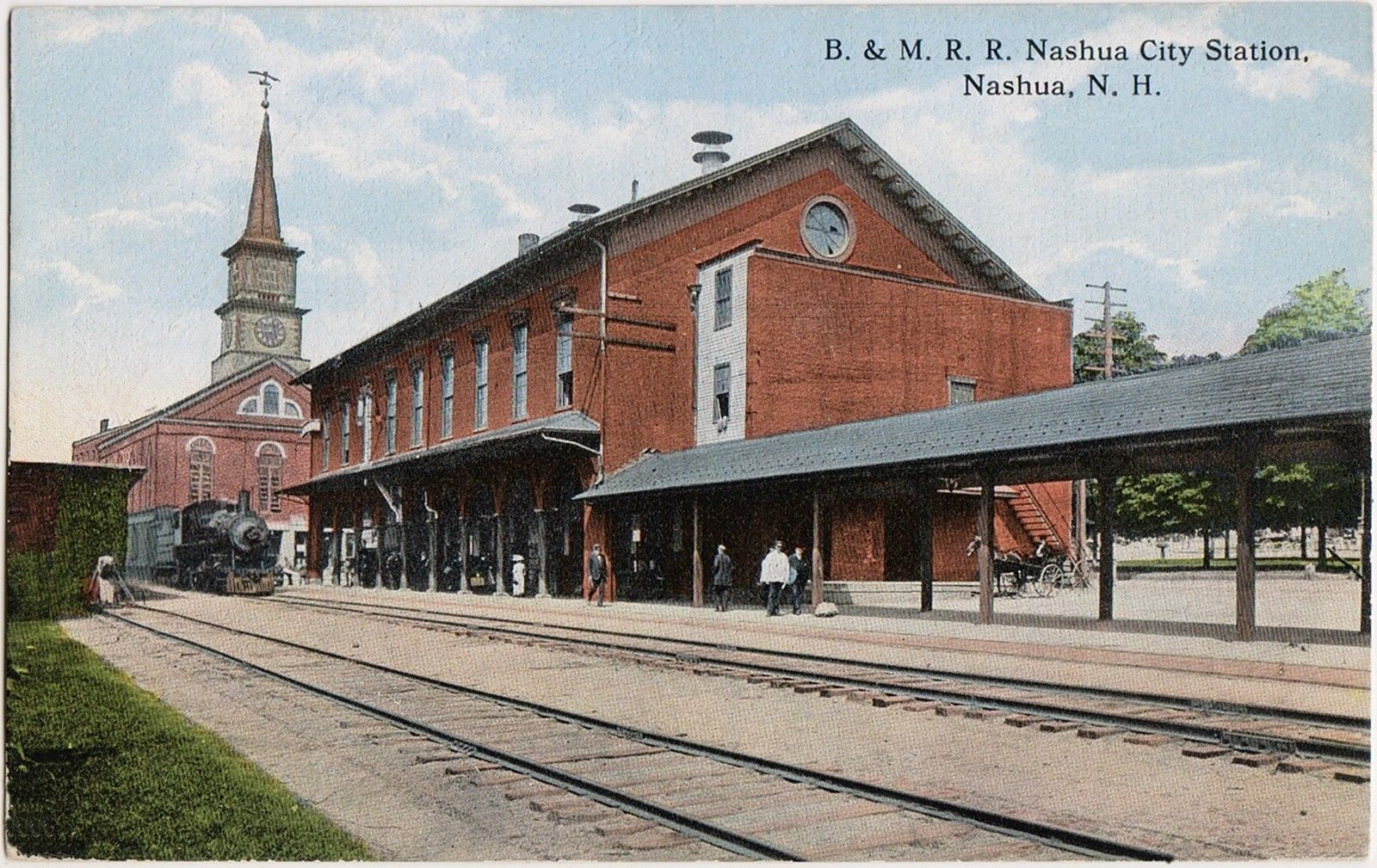
The train station in Nashua, seen in the early 1900s after the Boston and Maine took control

The Nashua and Lowell Railroad initially opened between Lowell and a temporary station just south of the Nashua River in Nashua's southern outskirts on October 8, 1838. Following the opening of a bridge across the river, the railroad was fully completed in December 1838, with the first train running on December 23. Upon opening, the Nashua and Lowell was the first railroad in the state of New Hampshire. The company quickly became profitable thanks to large amounts of passenger and freight traffic; in its first full year of operations, the company reported carrying 74,000 passengers. In the early 1840s, the company built a branch westward to Greenfield, where it met the Concord Railroad. In 1848, a second track was added between Nashua and Lowell to alleviate heavy traffic.

The Nashua and Lowell soon expanded by taking control of several other companies. In 1848, the company agreed to operate the Stony Brook Railroad, which was approaching completion of construction between North Chelmsford and Ayer. This was followed in 1869 by a 20-year lease of the Manchester and Keene Railroad, which planned to build between Keene and Hancock. The N&L acquired the lease in exchange for agreeing to ensure the railroad was built and paying a 6 percent dividend annually on the total cost of the railroad, less $200,000.

Starting in 1857, the Nashua and Lowell operated jointly with the Boston and Lowell, allowing for a single railroad to connect Nashua to Boston. The two companies agreed to pool both revenue and expenses, with 69 percent allocated to the Boston and Lowell, while the remaining 31 percent went to the Nashua and Lowell. During this joint operation, the combined railroad was known unofficially as the Boston, Lowell & Nashua. This arrangement ended in late 1878, following a dispute among the Nashua and Lowell's board of directors. A majority of the company's directors were in favor of a plan to have the company leased to the Boston and Lowell, but a Mr. Brooks threatened to file an injunction against such an action in New Hampshire court. The Nashua and Lowell's president and several members of the board of directors resigned, and Brooks took control of the railroad and announced it would be breaking joint operations with the Boston and Lowell. The two railroads each resumed independent operation of their respective lines in early December 1878.

=== Lease by the Boston and Lowell ===
Independent operations ended in 1880, when the Boston and Lowell leased the entirety of the Nashua and Lowell. Despite being the lessor of the Boston and Lowell, the Nashua and Lowell filed a bill of equity in circuit court against its parent in January 1884, alleging that it had violated the pooling agreement between the two companies, "in making independent contracts with other roads, in the building of terminal facilities in Boston, and in failing to pay the share due the Lowell & Nashua Railroad since July 1, 1872." The N&L sought to recover approximately $200,000 (equivalent to $6,999,259 in 2024) in damages.

=== Boston and Maine era ===
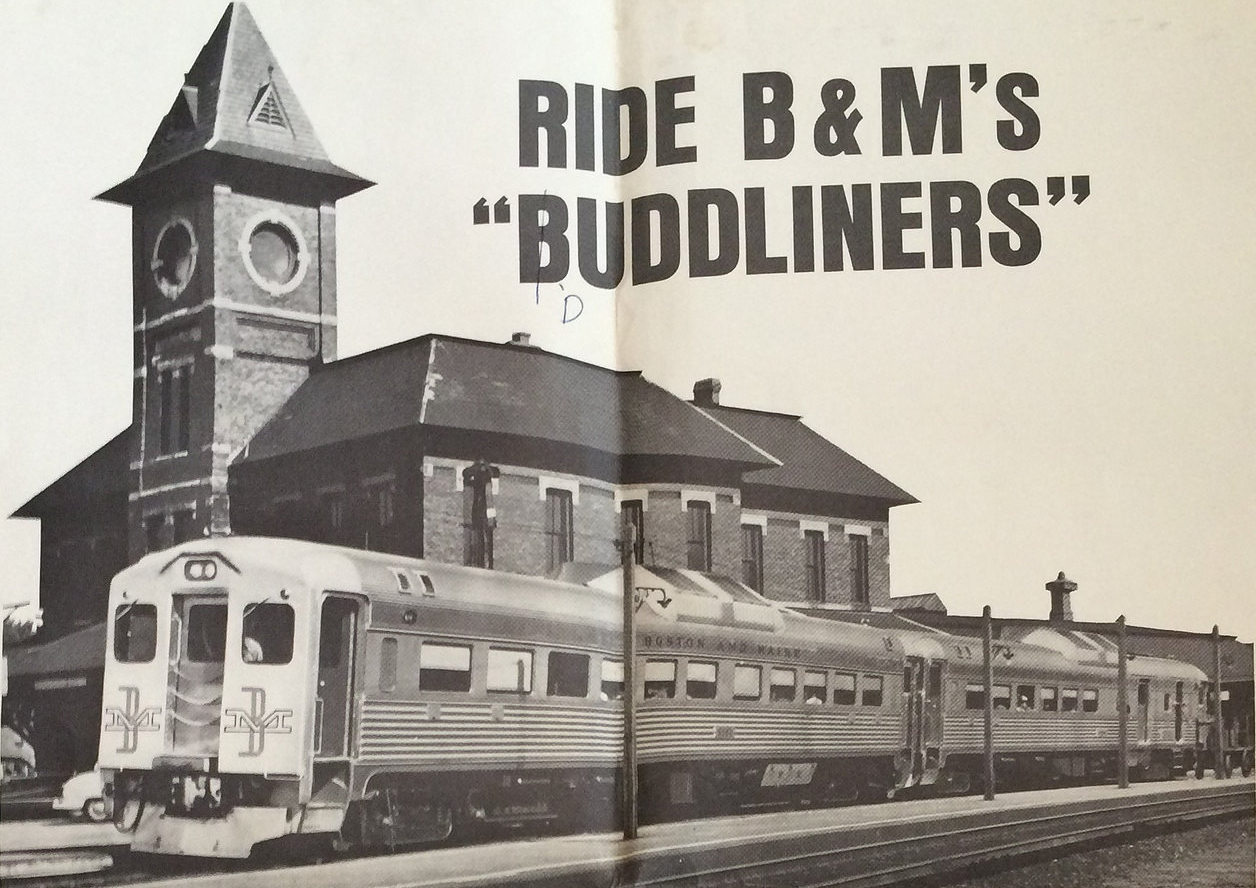
A poster advertising B&M train service showing Nasua Union Station in 1963. Four years later, passenger service was eliminated entirely.

The Boston and Lowell was itself leased by the Boston and Maine Corporation in 1887, though the Boston and Lowell continued to hold the lease for the Nashua and Lowell. Under the Boston and Maine, the line was reduced to single track. The Nashua and Lowell continued to exist as a company until May 31, 1944, when the company's shareholders accepted a $880,000 (equivalent to $15,718,563 in 2024) purchase offer from the Boston and Maine, which wanted to simplify its finances by absorbing companies it had long leased. While the line remained important for freight transportation, passenger service declined before being eliminated entirely in 1967. A return of passenger service by MBTA Commuter Rail was briefly attempted in 1980, before being suspended in February 1981 due to low ridership.

=== Guilford and the Milford-Bennington Railroad ===
After going bankrupt in the 1970s, the Boston and Maine was purchased by Guilford Transportation Industries in 1983, which became the new tenant of the former Nashua and Lowell trackage. As of 2021, Guilford (known since 2003 as Pan Am Railways) continues to operate a freight service on the line between Lowell and Wilton, New Hampshire, while the former Nashua and Lowell tracks between Wilton and Greenfield are operated by the Milford-Bennington Railroad. The city of Nashua states that 75 percent of freight entering New Hampshire travels along the former Nashua and Lowell line.

== Station listing ==
Miles (km) from Boston	City	Station	Connections and notes
25.6 (41.2)	Lowell	Lowell	Junction with Boston and Lowell Railroad
27.3 (43.9)	Lowell	Middlesex	
28.6 (46.0)	Chelmsford	North Chelmsford	Junction with Stony Brook Railroad
30.5 (49.1)	Tyngsborough, MA	Vesper Club	Footbridge across the Merrimack River to Vesper Country Club
32.1 (51.7)	Tyngsborough, MA	Tyngsboro (Tyngsboro and Dunstable)	
35.2 (56.6)	Nashua, NH	South Nashua	
39.0 (62.8)	Nashua, NH	Nashua Union Station	Junction with Worcester, Nashua and Rochester Railroad, Concord Railroad, and Nashua, Acton and Boston Railroad
39.7 (63.9)	Nashua, NH	Nashua City Station	Junction with Wilton Railroad
