= Sandy Pond School =

- U.S. National Register of Historic Places
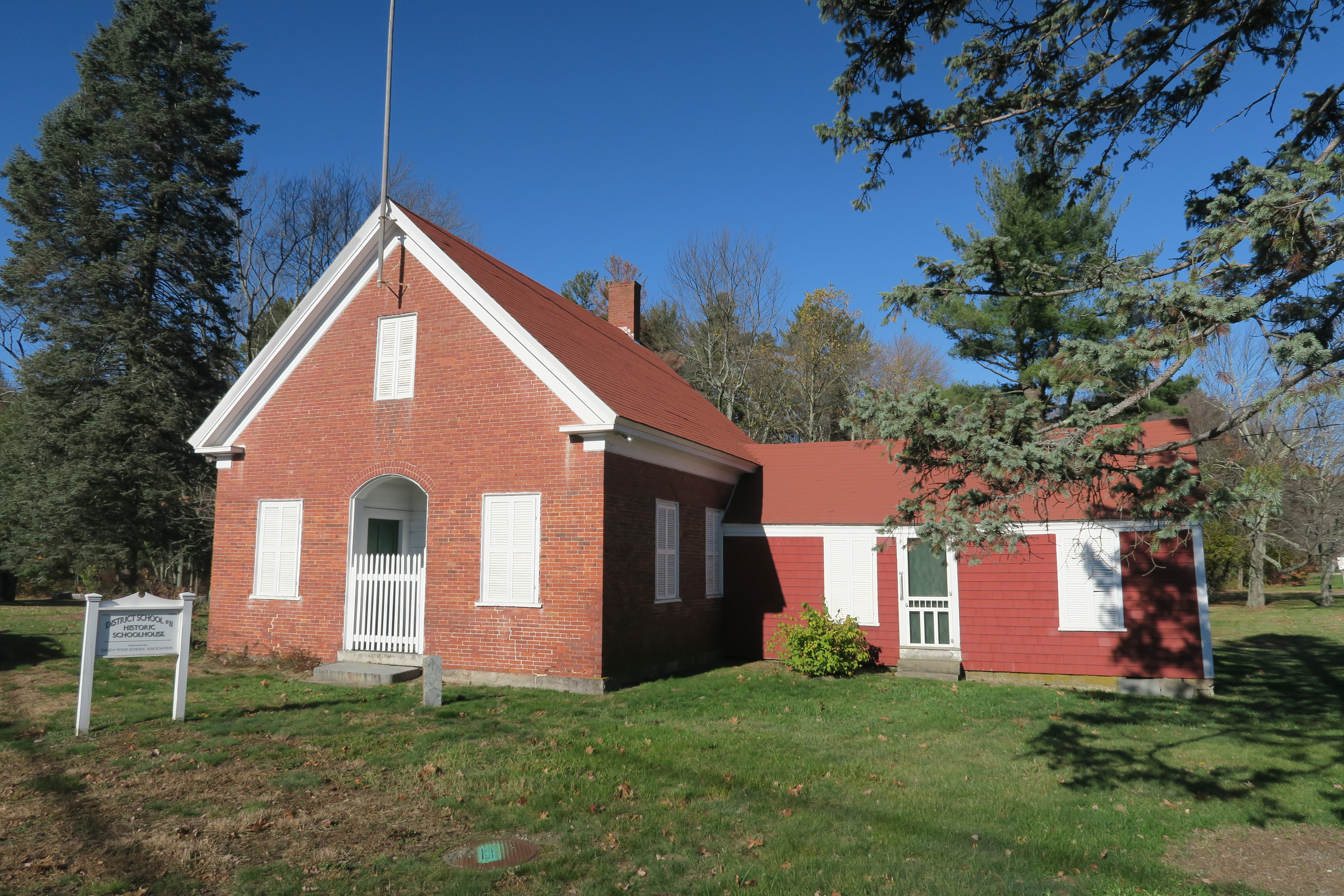
- Sandy Pond School

- Location within Massachusetts Location within the United States
- Location: 150 Sandy Pond Rd., Ayer, Massachusetts
- Coordinates: 42°33′34″N 71°32′27″W
- Built: 1868
- Architectural style: Greek Revival
- NRHP reference No.: 100000971
- Added to NRHP: May 8, 2017

The Sandy Pond School is a historic school building at 150 Sandy Pond Road in Ayer, Massachusetts. Built in 1868, it is the only surviving district school building in the town. Now a local museum, it was listed on the National Register of Historic Places in 2017.

== Description and history ==
The Sandy Pond School is located at the northwest corner of the threeway junction of Westford, Sandy Pond, and Willow Streets in eastern Ayer. It is a single-story brick building, with a small shingled wood-frame ell attached. It is covered by a gabled roof, and is oriented facing roughly south. Its main facade is symmetrical, with sash windows flanking the entrance, and another sash window in the gable above. The entrance is recessed under a segmented arch. The interior has tongue-and-groove flooring, beadboard, wainscoting with blackboards and plastering above.

The school was built in 1868, when the area was part of Groton. It served as Groton's district 11 school until 1871, when Ayer was incorporated. Local parents resisted consolidation of the school into a graded elementary school until 1906, when streetcar service was introduced on Sandy Pond Road. The school was closed in that year, and has been owned by a local nonprofit organization since then. It has housed reunions of school attendees, community meetings, dances, and other social events. The ell was added in the 1910s to provide a kitchen space for these types of events.

== See also ==
- National Register of Historic Places listings in Middlesex County, Massachusetts
