= Stony Brook (Merrimack River tributary) =

River in northeastern Massachusetts

Coordinates: 42°38′18″N 71°22′29″W

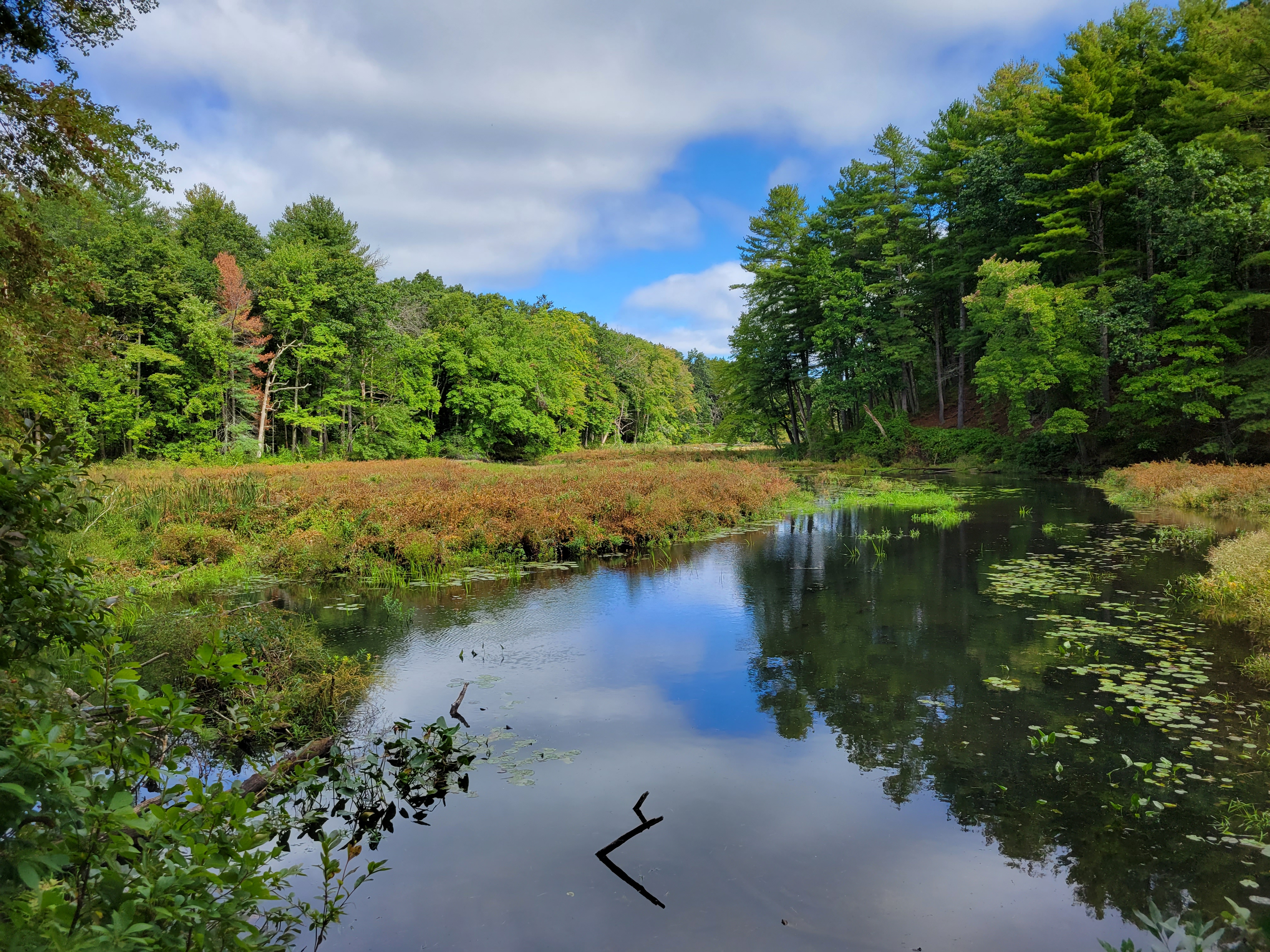
Stony Brook in Westford

Stony Brook is a tributary of the Merrimack River in northeastern Massachusetts, joining the Merrimack at Chelmsford.

Its watershed includes the towns of Boxborough, Harvard, Littleton, Ayer, Groton, Westford, Tyngsborough, and Chelmsford.

Its farthest upstream tributary is Beaver Brook, originating in Wolf Swamp in Boxborough, 22 miles (35 km) upstream (southwest) of the mouth of Stony Brook in the Merrimack. Beaver Brook passes through Mill Pond in the center of Littleton and ends at Forge Pond at Forge Village in Westford.

Stony Brook originates as the dammed outlet of Forge Pond and continues northeast past Graniteville, the Stony Brook Reservoir (not to be confused with the Stony Brook Reservoir in Weston and Waltham), Westford Station, Nabnasset, Brookside Station, and West Chelmsford, reaching the Merrimack at North Chelmsford.

Stony Brook is parallel through its course by the Stony Brook Railroad.
