= C. H. Lewis =

C. H. Lewis may refer to:

- Cicero Hunt Lewis (1826–1897), merchant and investor
- an alias of C. L. Blood (born ca. 1834), a con artist and patent medicine salesman
