= Nashua, Acton and Boston Railroad =

Defunct railroad in Massachusetts and New Hampshire

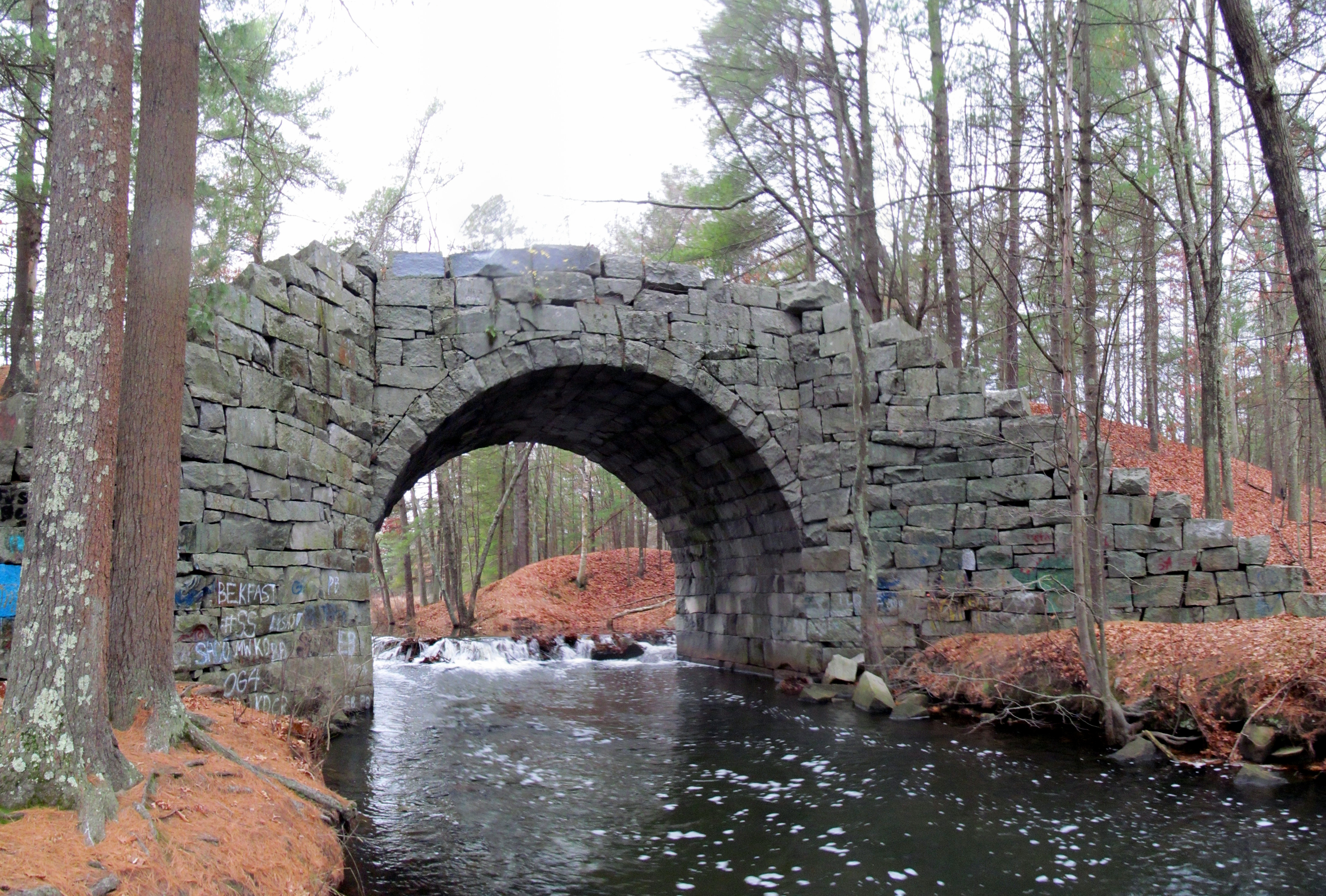
- The former arch bridge in Westford, Massachusetts

Overview
- Locale: Massachusetts and New Hampshire
- Dates of operation: 1873–1876 (independent operations); 1876–1921 (as a corporate entity)
- Successor: Boston and Maine Railroad

Technical
- Track gauge: 4 ft 8 1/2 in (1,435 mm) standard gauge
- Length: 24.3 miles (39.1 km)
- No. of tracks: 1

The Nashua, Acton and Boston Railroad (NA&B) was a railroad formed in 1871 to build a line between Nashua, New Hampshire, and Acton, Massachusetts. After opening in 1873, the railroad expanded to Concord, Massachusetts, and offered a commuter connection to Boston. It was leased by the Concord Railroad in 1876, with the lease later passing to the Boston and Maine Railroad in 1895. Most of the railroad line was abandoned in the 1920s, though a short portion in Nashua continued to be operated until 1980.

== History ==
=== Construction and opening ===
The Nashua, Acton and Boston Railroad was formed in 1871 by an act passed by the Massachusetts General Court, with Nashua resident Edward H. Spalding as its first president. The founders of the new railroad were upset with the management of the Nashua and Lowell Railroad, and it was later alleged by a local newspaper that Spalding incorporated the company because the Nashua and Lowell's president refused to renew his annual pass to ride the railroad. In June 1871, Spalding petitioned the governor and New Hampshire General Court for a charter:

...from some convenient point on the State line between the towns of Nashua, in this state, and Dunstable, in the State of Massachusetts, and running to the City of Nashua to connect with the Worcester & Nashua railroad, the Nashua & Lowell railroad, the Wilton railroad, the Concord railroad, and the proposed Nashua & Rochester railroad, at said Nashua.

New Hampshire granted Spalding a charter the next year, allowing construction to commence. The railroad's construction was supported by the Concord Railroad, which wanted an alternate route from its southern terminus in Nashua to Boston. At the time of the Nashua, Acton and Boston Railroad's construction, the only route between Nashua and Boston was via the Nashua and Lowell Railroad.

Construction of the 20-mile-long (32 km) line took place between 1872 and 1873. Spalding built the railroad "as straight as a gun barrel" after construction made it out of the Nashua city limits. This required the demolition of a ledge approximately four miles (6.4 km) miles away from Nashua, which involved the first use of dynamite in New Hampshire's history. Construction was completed in June 1873, with the railroad's first passenger train arriving in Nashua on July 1, 1873. Prior to opening, the railroad advertised it would charge a lower fare to passengers than its competitor; the Nashua, Acton and Boston pledged a fare of $1 for travel between Nashua and Boston, compared to the $1.20 offered by the Nashua and Lowell. The Nashua Daily Telegraph commented, "While we welcome this reduction, we hope that it will lead to no ruinous competition between the Lowell and the Acton."

=== Operating history ===
Soon after opening, the company obtained a charter for a four-mile-long (6.4 km) extension southward from Acton to Concord, where it connected with the Fitchburg Railroad. This new connection allowed the Nashua, Acton and Boston to offer an alternative route from New Hampshire to Boston and compete with the combined Nashua and Lowell and Boston and Lowell Railroad system that was previously the only railroad along this route. Three passenger trains per day operated along the railroad in each direction, powered by the company's two steam locomotives.

The Nashua, Acton and Boston managed to run its trains in comparable time to the Nashua and Lowell, despite its route being six miles (9.7 km) longer than that of its competitor. Ultimately, the company struggled to turn a profit due to long layover times at Concord, where passengers transferred to the Fitchburg Railroad to reach Boston. The railroad was locally nicknamed the "Red Line" due to its operating losses ("red" symbolizing the color used in finance to depict losses). The competing Nashua and Lowell/Boston and Lowell system was integrated and allowed seamless travel between Nashua and Boston, giving it a major competitive advantage.

=== Takeover by the Concord Railroad ===
[Residents] wondered that any railroad should be so absurdly managed as to have complaint made by one or two hundred people on this line of road to the state authorities, representing their grievances. They could not believe that any manager of a railroad could, in his sober senses, be so blind to the interest of his employers and so regardless of his own credit, as a business man, as to run a road so incommodiously and obviously hostile to the reasonable convenience of the legitimate patrons of his line of road... -An article in the Nashua Daily Telegraph, published February 19, 1879

The Nashua, Acton and Boston survived as an independent company only until 1876, when it was leased in its entirety by the Concord Railroad, which had been heavily involved in the NA&B from the beginning. Service rapidly declined along the line following the Concord's takeover, generating complaints from residents in the area. While as an independent company, the Nashua, Acton and Boston operated three passenger trains a day in each direction, the new owners operated only one train daily, which left Nashua at 6:30 in the morning for Boston and returned in the afternoon.

=== Boston and Maine purchase and abandonment ===
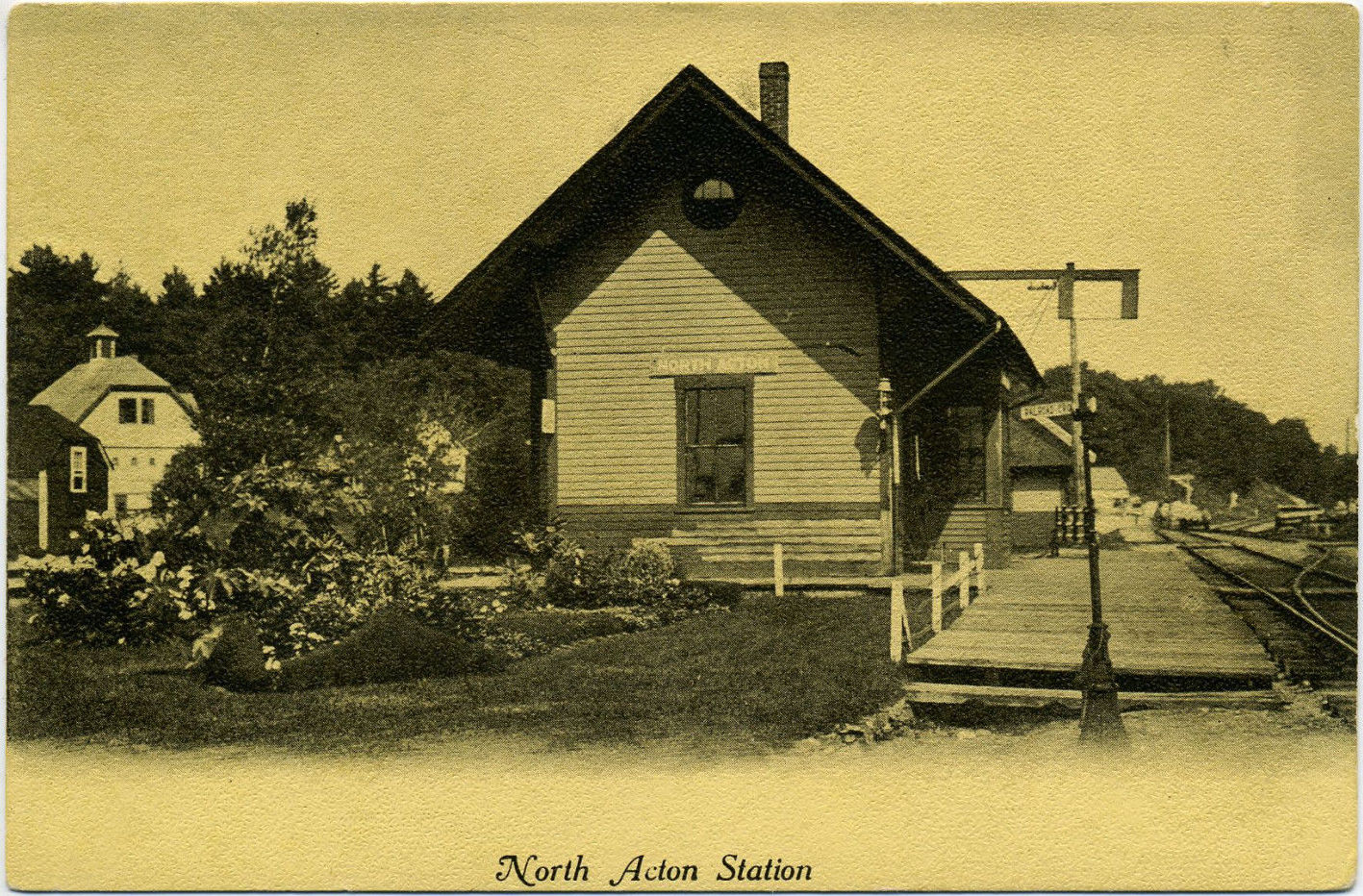
North Acton station, circa 1907–1915

The Boston and Maine Railroad (B&M) took over the Concord, by then known as the Concord and Montreal Railroad, in 1895, thereby gaining control of the Nashua, Acton and Boston as well. On paper the Concord Railroad continued to lease the Nashua, Acton and Boston, while the Boston and Maine in turn leased the Concord, so B&M effectively controlled the Nashua, Acton and Boston. In 1905, the Concord and Montreal foreclosed on the Nashua, Acton and Boston's mortgage bonds following approval by the New Hampshire legislature. A further corporate reorganization occurred in 1909, when a new company known as the Nashua and Acton Railroad Company purchased the assets of the Nashua, Acton and Boston from the Concord and Montreal, though still under the lease of the Boston and Maine. In March 1921, the New Hampshire legislature authorized the Boston and Maine to purchase outright the Nashua and Acton, formally ending the company's existence.

Regardless of the changes to the company on paper, traffic continued to decline, with the last through passenger train operating in June 1921. After this point, the only train service along the line was a single daily freight train out of Nashua, mostly carrying lumber for customers in Groton. The Boston and Maine filed to abandon nearly all of the line in August 1924, with the Interstate Commerce Commission approving abandonment in April of the following year. Despite objections from remaining shippers, the final trains ran in May 1925, with the entire line being abandoned apart from the first two miles (3.2 km) out of Nashua. This spur line continued to be used for freight traffic until 1980, when it too was abandoned.

== Station and junction listing ==
Miles (km)	City	Station	Connections and notes
0.0 (0)	Concord	Concord Junction	Junction with Fitchburg Railroad
1.9 (3.1)	Acton	Acton	
4.2 (6.8)	Acton	North Acton	Junction with Framingham and Lowell Railroad
8.2 (13.2)	Westford	East Littleton	
10.2 (16.4)	Westford	Pine Ridge (Westford)	
11.0 (17.7)	Westford	Bridge over Stony Brook Railroad and Lowell and Fitchburg Street Railway (no station or track connections)	
11.1 (17.9)	Westford	West Graniteville (Graniteville)	
15.2 (24.5)	Groton	East Groton	
17.9 (28.8)	Dunstable, MA	Dunstable	
23.0 (37.0)	Nashua, NH	Sandy Pond	
23.5 (37.8)	Nashua, NH	Otterson Street	
24.3 (39.1)	Nashua, NH	Nashua Union Station	Junction with Worcester, Nashua and Rochester Railroad, Concord Railroad, Nashua and Lowell Railroad
