= Stony Brook Railroad =

Railroad line in Massachusetts

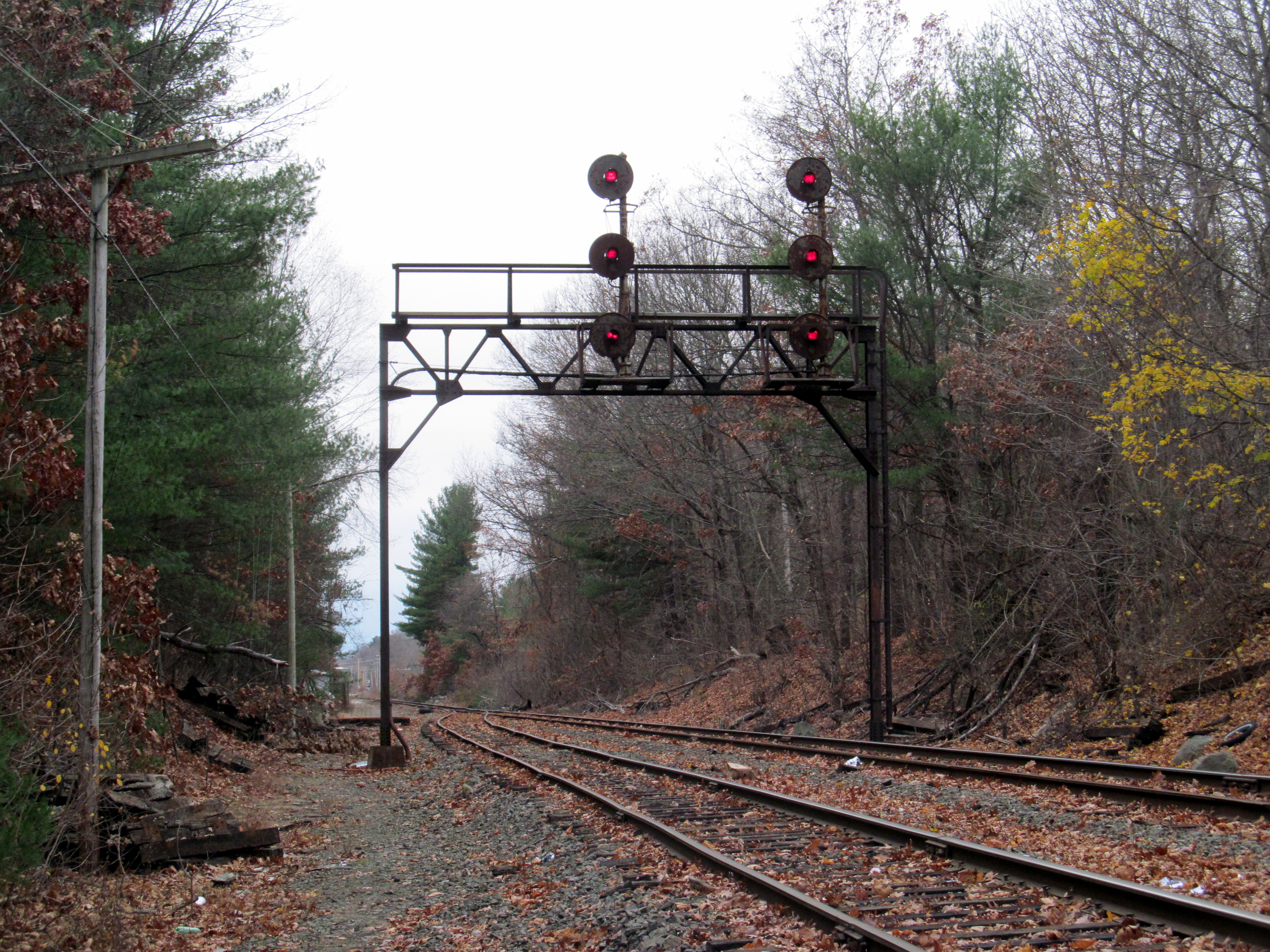
- A signal bridge on the former Stony Brook Railroad in Graniteville

Overview
- Operator: CSX Transportation
- Dates of operation: 1848–2022

Technical
- Track gauge: 4 ft 8 1/2 in (1,435 mm) standard gauge
- Length: 10.8 miles (17.4 km); 13.19 miles (21.23 km) (Originally)

The Stony Brook Railroad (formally the Stony Brook Railroad Corporation), chartered in 1845, was a railroad company in Massachusetts, United States. The company constructed a rail line between the Nashua and Lowell Railroad's main line at the village of North Chelmsford and the town of Ayer, Massachusetts (then the village of South Groton) where it connected to the Fitchburg Railroad. Rather than running its own trains, upon opening in 1848 operations were contracted to the Nashua and Lowell; this arrangement continued until the Nashua and Lowell was leased by the Boston and Lowell Railroad in 1880. The Boston and Maine Railroad (B&M) took over operation of the Stony Brook in 1887 when it leased the Boston and Lowell Railroad. In 1983 the B&M was purchased by Guilford Rail System, which renamed itself Pan Am Railways (PAR) in 2006. Passenger service last ran on the line in 1961, but it saw significant freight service under Pan Am Railways. While it never owned rolling stock or ran trains, the Stony Brook Railroad Corporation existed until 2022 as a nearly wholly owned subsidiary of the Boston and Maine, itself a PAR subsidiary. That year, it was merged into CSX Transportation as part of CSX's purchase of Pan Am Railways.

The Stony Brook Railroad was named after Stony Brook, a tributary of the Merrimack River, which the line follows for several miles.

== History ==
=== Formation, construction, and Nashua and Lowell operations ===
The Stony Brook Railroad was chartered in 1845 by citizens of Lowell, Massachusetts, to connect the city with points south and west. Construction of the line, which connected North Chelmsford and Ayer, was begun in 1847 and completed the following year. As the line approached completion, the Stony Brook decided to contract out train operations to the Nashua and Lowell Railroad (N&L), which connected to the line at its eastern terminus in North Chelmsford, rather than purchasing and operating their own trains. While the Stony Brook Railroad Corporation maintained its existence as the owner of the tracks, the N&L operated the Stony Brook line as a part of its own system, and this continued when the N&L formed a railroad pool with the Boston and Lowell Railroad in 1857.

The Nashua and Lowell only made a modest profit from operating the Stony Brook Railroad, but this was considered preferable to allowing the competing Fitchburg Railroad to gain control of the line. In 1877, the B&L and N&L decided to terminate their joint operating agreement, and the line reverted to sole control and operation by the Nashua and Lowell Railroad.

One unusual source of traffic on the Stony Brook Railroad was ice, which was cut from several ponds adjacent to the right of way and shipped to customers via the railroad.

=== Boston and Lowell and Boston and Maine operations ===
Following the breakup of the joint Nashua and Lowell and Boston and Lowell operating agreement, the Boston and Lowell leased its former partner in 1880, becoming the operator of the Stony Brook Railroad as well.

The Boston and Maine Railroad (B&M) leased the Boston and Lowell in 1887, also gaining control of the Stony Brook Railroad. Under the B&M, the line grew in importance as a route for traffic between Maine and the rest of the United States which bypassed the busy city of Boston.

==== Infrastructure improvements ====
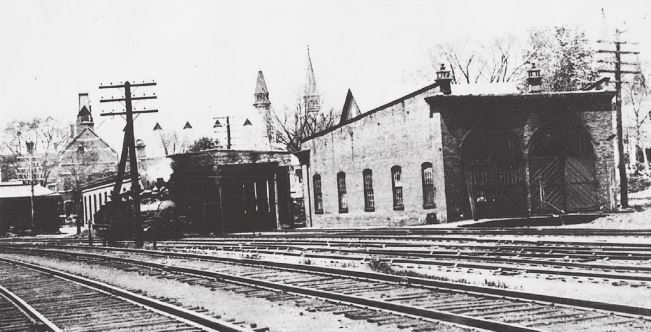
An engine house and freight house in Ayer, Massachusetts, on the Stony Brook Railroad, circa 1903, along with a locomotive

The B&M installed block signals on the Stony Brook around 1914, as a means of improving the line's capacity. This proved insufficient on its own, so in 1917 the B&M followed up by installing double track on the first few miles of each end of the line, both between West Chelmsford and North Chelmsford, and between Willows and Ayer Junction. A decade later, continued heavy traffic led to the installation of both double track and centralized traffic control (CTC), the latter believed to be the first such installation in New England. These improvements began in 1927 and were completed the following year. A wye was constructed in 1930 at North Chelmsford, which allowed trains traveling to or from Nashua, New Hampshire, to use the line without having to make a reverse movement.

As built, the Stony Brook Railroad's tracks paralleled those of the Fitchburg Railroad between Ayer Junction and Willows. In April 1946, the B&M built a connection between the two lines at Willows, allowing for the duplicate trackage to Ayer Junction to be abandoned. This reduced the Stony Brook Railroad to 10.86 miles (17.48 km) in length. In 1957, the second track was taken up from Willows to Graniteville and from Westford to North Chelmsford, a change made possible by CTC.

==== Buffalo Bill derailment ====
On May 24, 1911, a circus train carrying Buffalo Bill's Wild West show derailed on the Stony Brook Railroad near Brookside. The accident, described by The Boston Globe as "one of the most spectacular in the history of railroading in this section," was later reported to have been caused by a ramp for loading and unloading elephants. This ramp was not securely fastened and became loose while the train traveled, hitting an assortment of lineside objects until finally hitting a switch stand in Brookside, derailing the train. While no one was killed, three showmen were seriously injured, and two unfortunate burros were fatally crushed by an elephant. Members of the show, with the assistance of a Boston and Maine Railroad wrecking crew, gradually freed the trapped men and animals from the derailed cars, and the Wild West show proceeded to Lowell by road instead.

=== Pan Am Railways operations ===
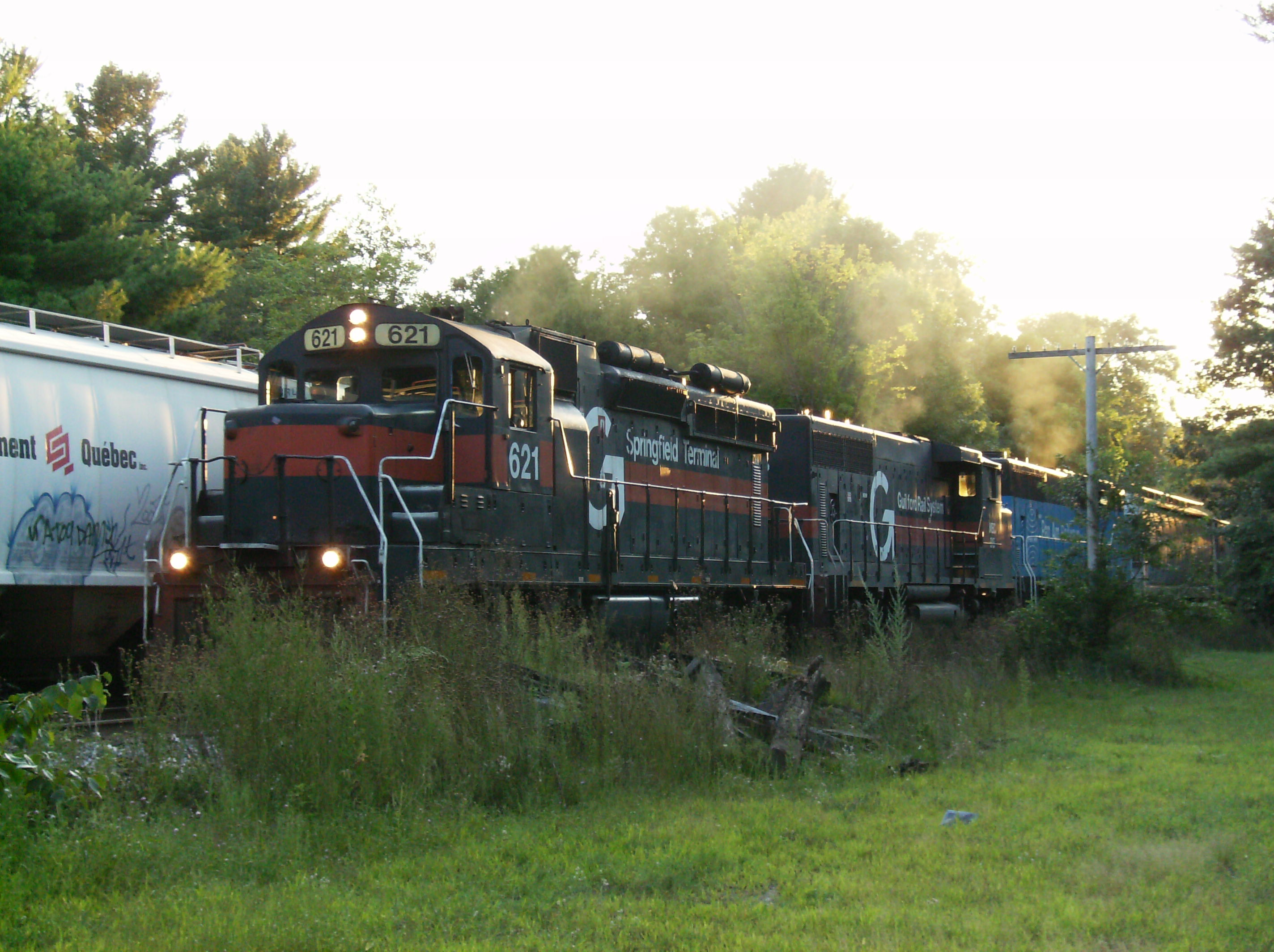
A Pan Am Railways train on the Stony Brook Railroad in 2007

The Boston and Maine Railroad became a part of Guilford Transportation Industries in 1983. Until May 2022, the Stony Brook line was operated by Pan Am Railways as part of its main line through Massachusetts. It served as a connection between Northern New England and points west. The Stony Brook Railroad Corporation nominally still existed as a paper railroad until 2022, under 99.27 percent ownership by the Boston and Maine, which was in turn owned by Pan Am Railways. As part of CSX Transportation's purchase of Pan Am Railways, the Stony Brook Railroad Corporation was merged into CSX with the rest of PAR on June 1, 2022, ending its existence as a company.

== Stations ==
Town	Distance from North Chelmsford	Station	Notes
Chelmsford	0.00 miles (0 km)	North Chelmsford	Connection to Nashua and Lowell Railroad
Chelmsford	2.06 miles (3.32 km)	West Chelmsford	
Westford	2.76 miles (4.44 km)	Brookside	
Westford	4.28 miles (6.89 km)	Westford	
Westford	6.11 miles (9.83 km)	Graniteville	
Westford	7.38 miles (11.88 km)	Forge Village	
Littleton	8.96 miles (14.42 km)	North Littleton	
Ayer	10.66 miles (17.16 km)	Willows	Formerly named Sandy Pond
Ayer	13.19 miles (21.23 km)	Ayer Junction	Connection to Fitchburg Railroad
