= Pan Am Railways =

American transportation company

Pan Am Railways, Inc.
- Company type: Subsidiary
- Industry: Rail transport
- Founded: 1981 (as Guilford Transportation Industries)
- Founder: Timothy Mellon
- Defunct: June 1, 2022, as an independent company
- Fate: Purchased by CSX Corporation
- Successor: CSX Transportation
- Headquarters: North Billerica, Massachusetts, United States of America
- Area served: Northeast
- Number of employees: 750 (2011)
- Parent: CSX Transportation (CSX Corporation)
- Subsidiaries: Boston and Maine Corporation; Maine Central Railroad Company; Portland Terminal Company; Springfield Terminal Railway Company; Stony Brook Railroad
- Website: panamrailways.com at the Wayback Machine (archived 2025-11-03)

Pan Am Railways, Inc. (PAR) is a subsidiary of CSX Corporation that operates Class II regional railroads covering northern New England from Mattawamkeag, Maine, to Rotterdam Junction, New York. Pan Am Railways is primarily made up of former Class II regional railroads such as Boston and Maine Corporation, Maine Central Railroad Company, Portland Terminal Company, and Springfield Terminal Railway Company. It was formerly known as Guilford Transportation Industries and was also known as Guilford Rail System. Guilford bought the name, colors, and logo of Pan American World Airways in 1998.

The company is a subsidiary of CSX Corporation under rail subsidiary CSX Transportation since June 1, 2022, Pan Am Railways former parent company was Portsmouth, New Hampshire-based Pan Am Systems. It was headquartered in Iron Horse Park in North Billerica, Massachusetts.

Pan Am Railways parent Pan Am Systems was put up for sale in July 2020. On November 30, 2020, CSX Corporation announced that it had signed a definitive agreement to purchase Pan Am Systems. The sale of Pan Am Systems to CSX underwent regulatory review by the Surface Transportation Board, which approved the sale on April 14, 2022. At midnight on June 1, 2022, CSX Corp began operating Pan Am Railways as a subsidiary of CSX Transportation; Pan Am Systems ceased operations.

== History ==
=== Guilford ===
==== Beginning ====
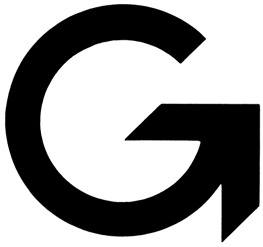
Guilford logo

The company was founded in May 1981 as Guilford Transportation Industries by Timothy Mellon, who quickly looked to form a railroad company in the Northeast through purchasing some of the area's bankrupt railroads. The company began by purchasing the Maine Central Railroad that same year, and also announced it was interested in purchasing the bankrupt Boston and Maine, making an offer that year. The company's purchase of the B&M was approved in 1983, adding it to Guilford's network.

Even as the B&M purchase was still pending, Guilford announced it intended to purchase the Delaware and Hudson Railway from its then owner Norfolk and Western Railway on September 1, 1981, marking the company's third acquisition. The next month, Timothy Mellon made an offer of $500,000 for the entirety of the D&H's stock, which was identical to the amount the Norfolk and Western had paid to buy the D&H in 1968. Both the D&H's directors and Norfolk and Western accepted the offer, in part to remove a potential obstacle to the pending merger between the N&W and the Southern Railway.

==== Expansion attempt ====
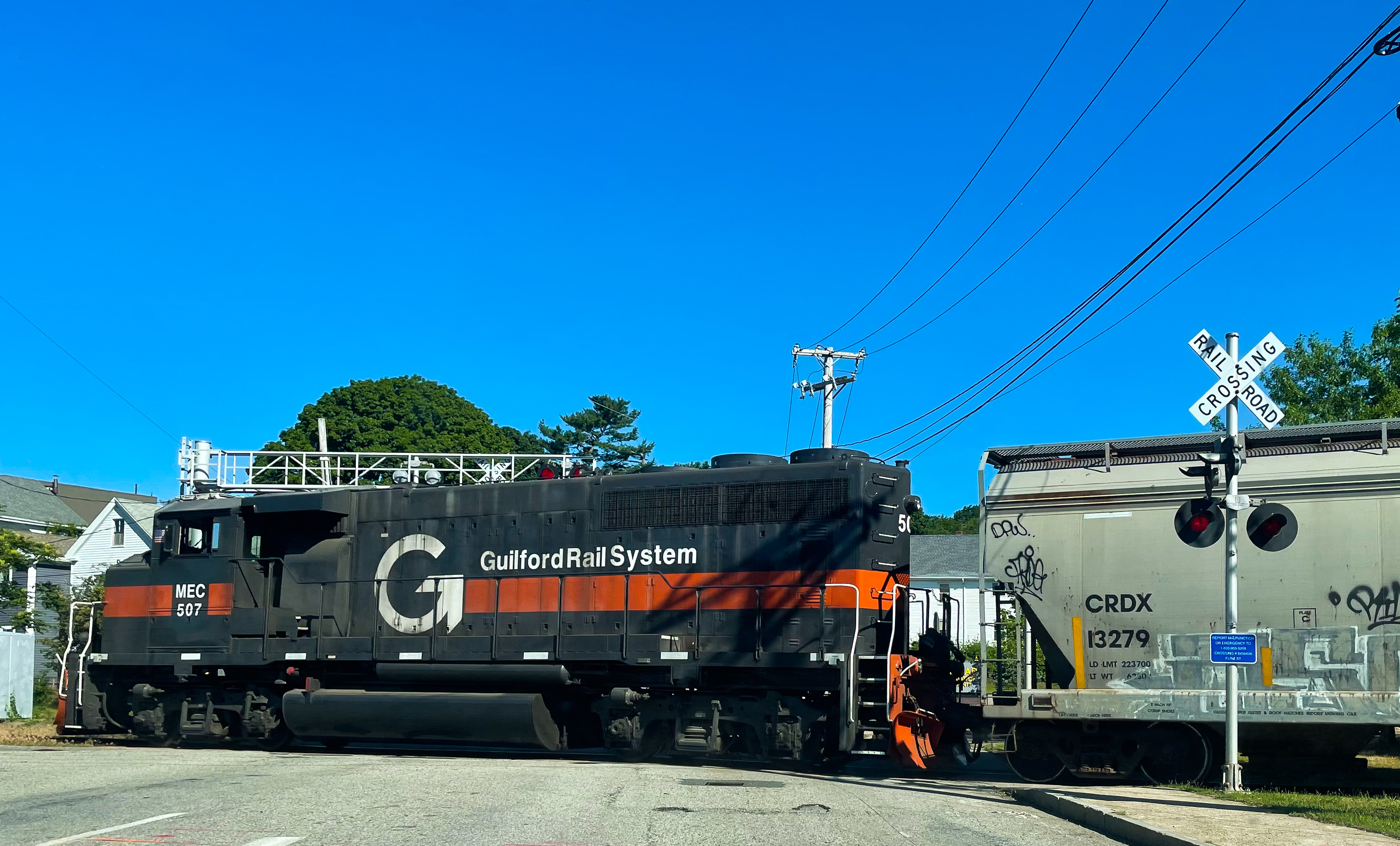
A Pan Am Railways locomotive in Salem, Massachusetts, in 2021 still wearing Guilford Rail System paint

In 1985, Guilford entered into an agreement with Norfolk Southern Railway (NS) to run trains to St. Louis. NS was attempting to win approval of a plan to purchase Conrail from the US government and proposed allowing Guilford to lease Conrail lines to St. Louis in order to restore competition that would be lost in the merger. The plan would have allowed Guilford to use the Conrail mainline from Toledo to Ridgeway, Ohio, and from Crestline, Ohio, to St. Louis. Guilford would also purchase 955 miles (1,537 km) of Conrail track and 1,300 freight cars from Norfolk Southern for $53M. NS did not prevail in its attempt to purchase Conrail in 1985, and the Guilford plan was dropped. In 1987, Guilford also placed a bid to buy the Southern Pacific Railroad (SP).

The paper industry provides the largest source of business, with chemicals, clay and pulp inbound, and finished paper outbound. But the railroad has been losing ground to other forms of transportation - particularly trucking. A 2008 report issued by the American Society of Civil Engineers rated Maine at 48th of the 50 states in volume of freight traffic that moves by rail.

==== Delaware and Hudson control ====
Guilford completed its acquisition of Delaware and Hudson Railway in 1984, purchasing the assets from Norfolk and Western Railway. When their planned western expansion fell through, with few prospects for growing freight traffic, and two intense labor strikes, Guilford filed the D&H for bankruptcy and disbanded the company, in June 1988. By an Interstate Commerce Commission emergency order, New York, Susquehanna and Western Railway provided service under subsidy until the line was sold to Canadian Pacific in 1991.

=== Pan Am Railways (2006–2022) ===
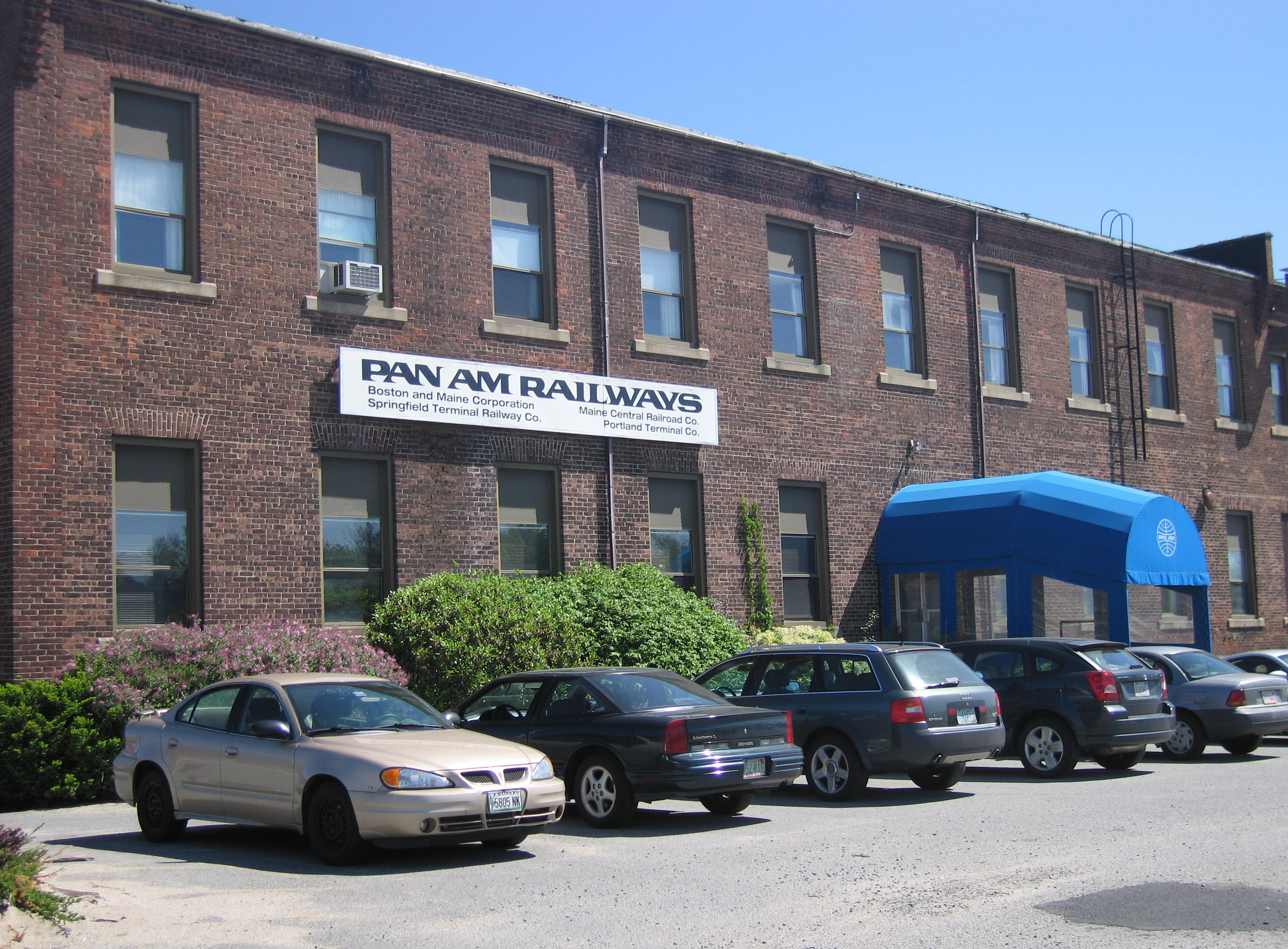
Pan Am Railways headquarters

In 1998, Guilford bought the name, colors, and logo of Pan American World Airways. In March 2006, Guilford Transportation Industries changed its name to Pan Am Railways (PAR). Then in March 2009, PAR was ordered to pay the largest corporate criminal fine in Massachusetts history — $500,000 — due to the company's negligence to report a spill of hundreds of gallons of diesel fuel in violation of state and federal environmental laws and regulations.

As of 2011, PAR employed 750 people and had a $40-million payroll. The company continued to operate with subsidiary entities bearing the names of former railroads which over time formed the company. The company's assets were housed separately in these various subsidiaries for various reasons. For example, the Boston and Maine Corporation owned the railroad property itself while the Springfield Terminal branch operated the railroad (most of the company's employees were under the Springfield Terminal umbrella.) Meanwhile, the Maine Central entity owns rolling stock.

In 2011, PAR repainted two EMD GP9 locomotives into heritage schemes commemorating the company's predecessors; GP9s number 77 and 52 were repainted into the Boston and Maine maroon and gold "Minuteman" paint scheme and the Maine Central "Pine Tree Route" green and gold livery, respectively. Both were sold to the Heber Valley Railroad in May 2018.

==== Partnership with Norfolk Southern ====
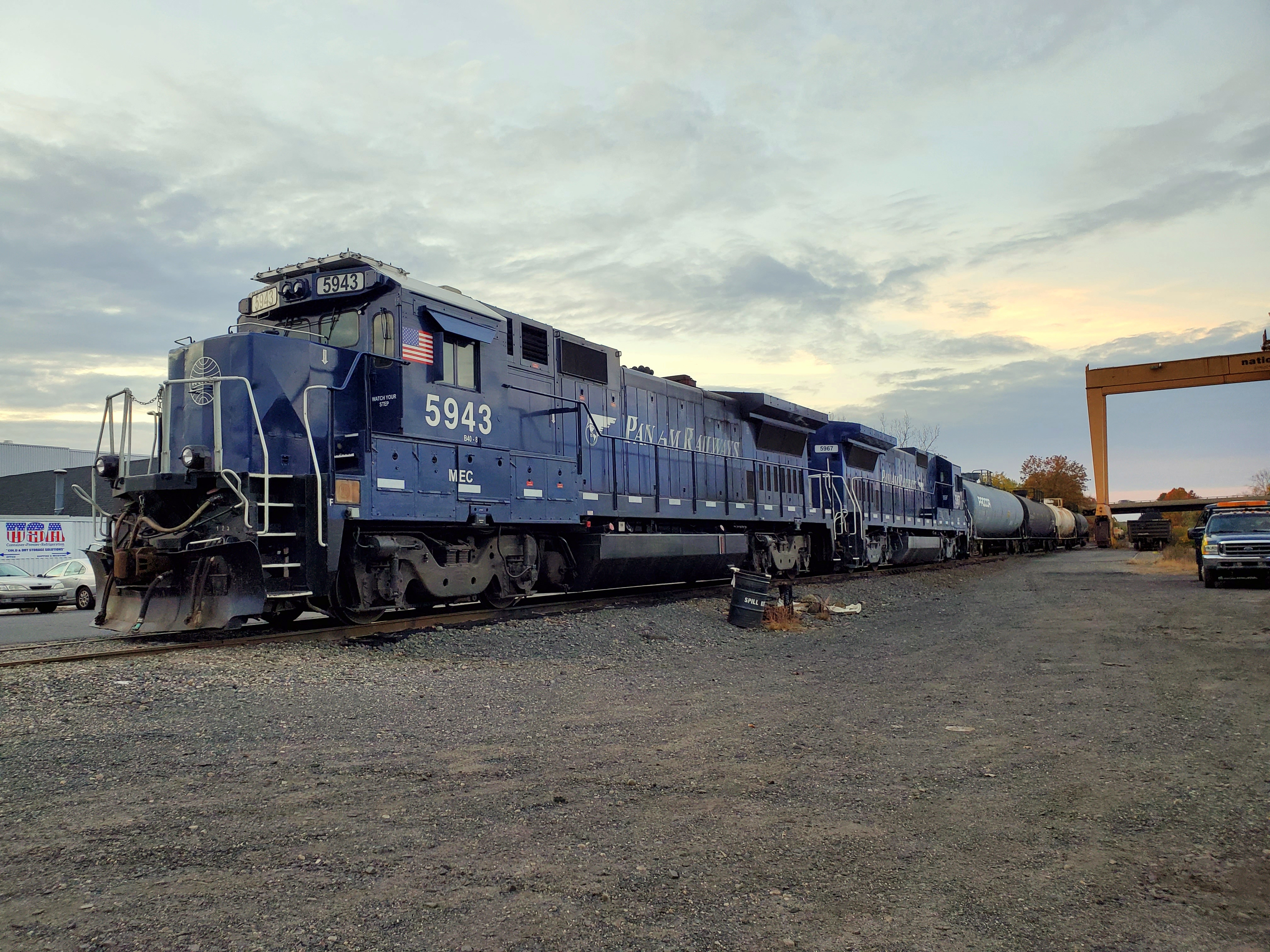
A Pan Am Railways train in Plainville, Connecticut, in 2020

On May 15, 2008, NS announced that it had come to an agreement with PAR to "create an improved rail route between Albany, New York, and the Boston, Massachusetts, region, named the Patriot Corridor. The STB approved the deal on March 10, 2009, with each railroad owning 50% of a new company known as Pan Am Southern (PAS). PAR's trackage between Ayer, Massachusetts, and Mechanicville, New York, was transferred to PAS, while its operations and maintenance were handled by PAR's ST subsidiary. NS transferred to PAS cash and property valued at $140 million.

Improvements to the route included track and signal upgrades, and expansion of terminals, including construction of new automotive and intermodal terminals in Ayer and Mechanicville. In March 2012, the Federal Railroad Administration awarded a $2-million grant to the Massachusetts Department of Transportation for preliminary engineering on removing 19 obstacles to allow double stack container trains to use the Patriot Corridor route. The project included raising clearance by two feet in the 4.75-mile (7.64 km) Hoosac Tunnel.

==== Disputes with local governments ====
The company was criticized for dumping used railroad ties that contain creosote rather than sending them for safe disposal or recycling.

=== CSX acquisition ===
Pan Am Railways parent Pan Am Systems was put up for sale in July 2020. On November 30, 2020, an agreement was announced for CSX Corporation (parent company for CSX Transportation) to acquire Pan Am Systems. Norfolk Southern has expressed concern about possible impacts on competition. The sale was proposed as follows: CSX will own and operate between Mattawamkeag, ME and Ayer, MA. Between Ayer and Rotterdam, NY, Genesee & Wyoming will be the operating party. This means the track will be owned by CSX but CSX will not dispatch it. Also, Norfolk Southern will keep its 49% stake in Pan Am Southern (PAS). With the sale, the intermodal traffic between Mechanicville and Ayer will be re-routed over Boston and Albany Railroad (B&A) to Worcester, MA. From there the traffic will come up the Worcester main and into Ayer Yard.

On March 25, 2021, after numerous letters questioning CSX's acquisition of Pan Am Railways parent Pan Am Systems from the Massachusetts Bay Transportation Authority, the Massachusetts Department of Transportation, the Commonwealth of Massachusetts, Vermont Rail System, as well as many other local political figures and community leaders from other New England states, the Surface Transportation Board ruled the acquisition as "Significant" meaning that a more rigorous review process would be necessary.

On April 30, 2021, CSX submitted a 478-page plan of purchase outlining a broad range of topics, from implementations of track upgrades to the controversial issue of Norfolk Southern intermodal routing, as well as the fate of Pan Am's hodgepodge fleet of aging motive power, which is made up of EMD and GE locomotives from railroads such as Conrail, NS, CSX, the Milwaukee Road, and Kansas City Southern.

On May 26, 2021, the federal regulators of the Surface Transportation Board rejected CSX's purchase application, deeming it "incomplete." The board cited "contradictions" and "lack of necessary information" to properly judge the acquisition, and therefore could not rule on the matter. The STB accepted a revised merger application for consideration on July 30, allowing CSX to move forward with the acquisition. The decision determined that an environmental and historic review are unnecessary and establishes criteria for additional filings, public comments, and a deadline for a final Surface Transportation Board decision.

On April 14, 2022, the Surface Transportation Board fully accepted the purchase by CSX Transportation of Pan Am Railways and 50% of Pan Am Southern. According to the board; CSX's control of Pan Am and subsequent merger of six of Pan Am's subsidiary railroads into CSX, subject to the voluntary commitments and settlement agreements to which the applicants have agreed, would not likely cause a substantial lessening of competition or create a monopoly or restraint of trade.

"The Board found several key benefits flowing from the merger. It would result in much-needed capital investments in the Pan Am network, as well as more consistent maintenance. Also, the Board found that shippers would have additional marketing opportunities and more efficient single-line service, and CSX would have the opportunity to better compete for traffic moving via long-haul trucking. The Board also noted environmental benefits in the form of fuel efficiency and lower emissions resulting from CSX’s use of newer line-haul and switching locomotives, compared to Pan Am’s locomotives." The combination of several trackage rights agreements in the approved plan will create a new route allowing Norfolk Southern to move double-stack intermodal trains and automobile trains from Voorheesville, New York to Ayer, Massachusetts (the Southern Route). The Hoosac Tunnel on the Pan Am Southern (the Northern Route), used by NS prior to this agreement, is too low for double-stack trains. Berkshire & Eastern Railroad (B&E), a wholly owned subsidiary of Genesee & Wyoming (G&W), will replace Springfield Terminal as the operator of Pan Am Southern. CSX made specific commitments in its filings and entered into settlement agreements with numerous parties that had initially raised concerns about the transaction.

== Routes ==
PAR's mainline ran from Mattawamkeag, Maine, to Mechanicville, New York, via the lines of the following former companies:

- MEC: European and North American Railway, MEC mainline
- B&M: B&M mainline, Lowell and Andover Railroad
- Boston & Lowell Railroad: Nashua and Lowell Railroad, Stony Brook Railroad
- Fitchburg Railroad: Fitchburg Railroad mainline, Vermont & Massachusetts Railroad, Troy and Greenfield Railroad, Southern Vermont Railroad, Troy & Boston Railroad, Boston, Hoosac Tunnel & Western Railway
