= F.E.L. Beal =

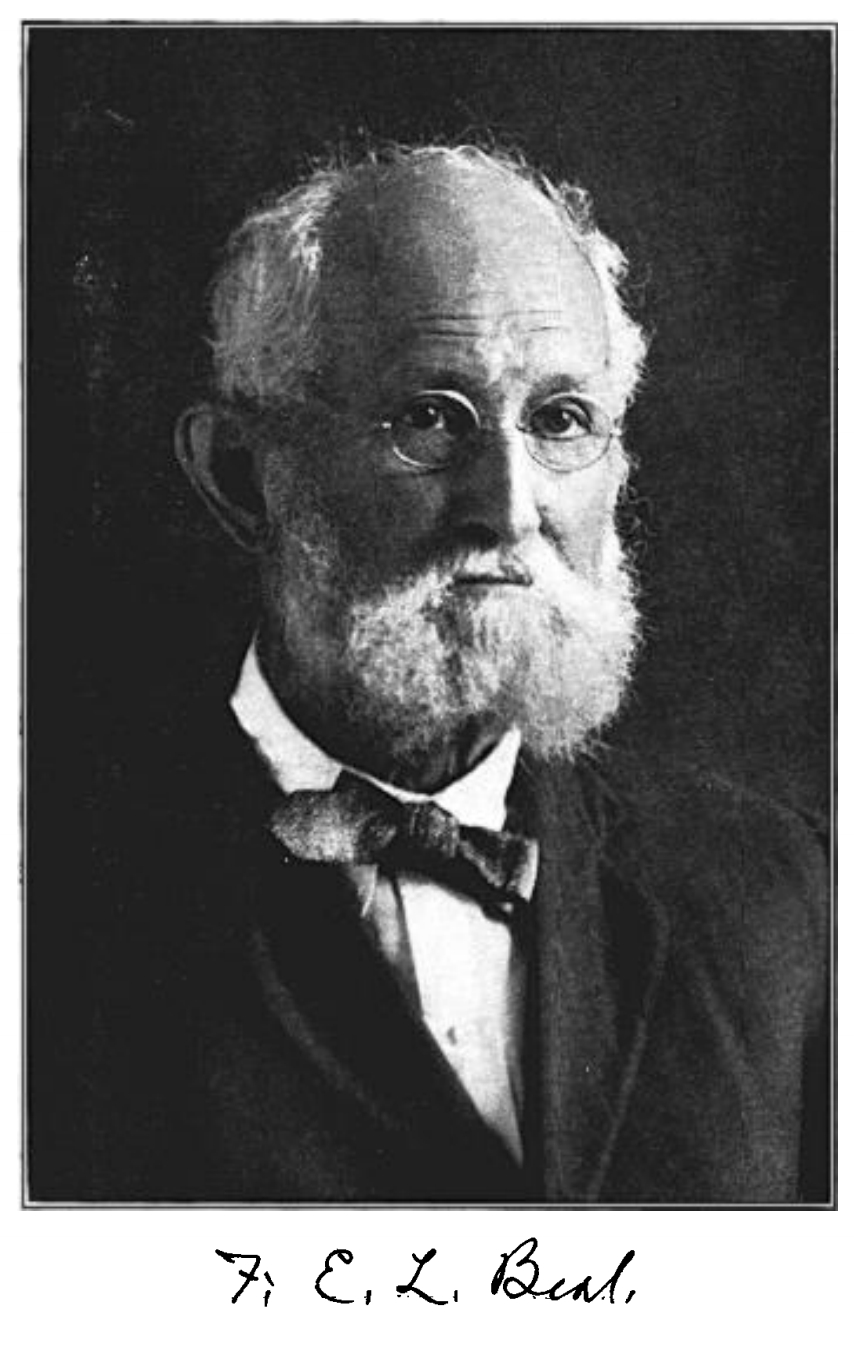

Foster Ellenborough Lascelles Beal (9 January 1840 – 30 September 1916) was an American pioneer of economic ornithology.

Beal was born in South Groton, Massachusetts the son of Jacob Foster Beal, a school teacher, railroad foreman, and farmer and Sarah Jane Day. His father died of tuberculosis when he was eight and since his mother had also contracted the illness, he was left to the care of Nathaniel C. Day, his mother's, cousin once removed. He never saw his mother, who died before he turned ten. He was taken care of by Mrs Day. During the Civil War, he enlisted with the army in 1864 and joined the 36th Massachusetts Regiment. He fell ill with tuberculosis and was discharged from the army. He recovered and tried to work in gardening. He then joined the first few students of the Massachusetts Institute of Technology and graduated in 1872. He worked for a while in civil engineering at Fitchburg and also taught mathematics at MIT from 1870 to 1874. In 1874 until 1875 he was an assistant professor of mathematics at the United States Naval Academy at Annapolis, MD. In 1876 he joined the agricultural college in Ames, Iowa as a professor of civil engineering but a few months later became professor of zoology and comparative anatomy holding those positions until 1883. Professor Beal joined the Department of Agriculture, in Washington, DC, in 1891. He specialized in economic ornithology and wrote a number of books on the subject. He was a member of the Biological Society of Washington and a fellow in the American Ornithological Union. He died in Branchville, Prince George's County, Maryland. He married Mary Louise Barnes in 1877.
