= Pan Am Southern =

Joint venture of CSX and Norfolk Southern

Overview
- Franchise: Berkshire and Eastern Railroad
- Parent company: Norfolk Southern, CSX Transportation
- Reporting mark: PAS
- Locale: New England, New York
- Dates of operation: 2009–Present

Technical
- Track gauge: 4 ft 8 1/2 in (1,435 mm) standard gauge

Pan Am Southern, LLC (reporting mark PAS) is a freight railroad jointly owned by Norfolk Southern Railway (NS) and CSX Corporation. PAS is independently operated by the Berkshire and Eastern Railroad, a subsidiary of Genesee & Wyoming. PAS owns trackage known as the Patriot Corridor between Albany, New York, and the Boston, Massachusetts, area, utilizing rail lines formerly owned by the Fitchburg Railroad and later on the Boston and Maine Railroad. It was previously operated by Pan Am Railways subsidiary Springfield Terminal Railway.

== History ==
=== 2008–2022 ===
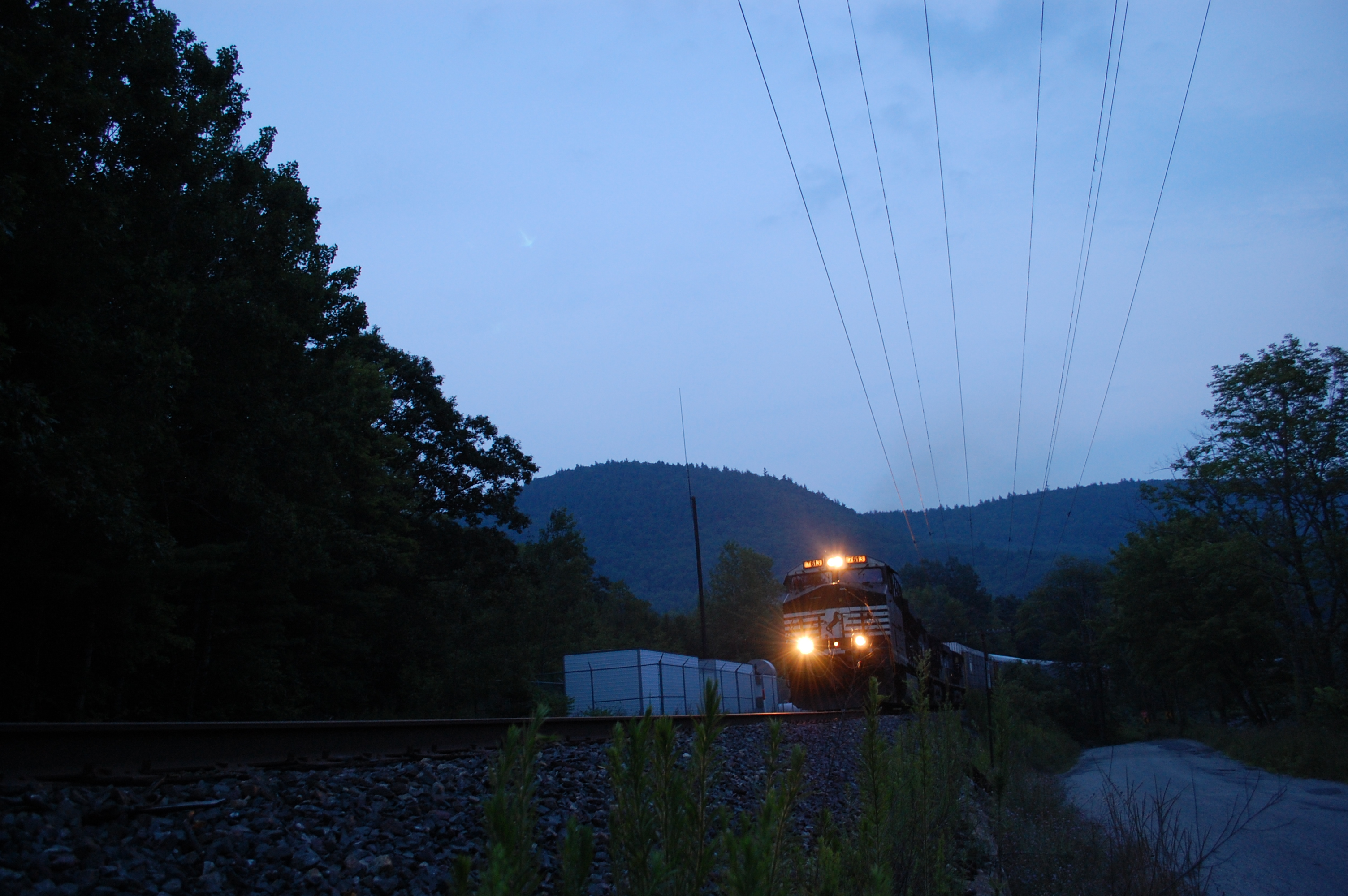
Westbound train on Pan Am Southern in Zoar, Massachusetts led by Norfolk Southern ES40DC 7613

On May 15, 2008, Norfolk Southern Railway announced that it had come to an agreement with Pan Am Railways (PAR) to "create an improved rail route between Albany, N.Y., and the greater Boston, Mass., area called the 'Patriot Corridor'."

On March 12, 2009, Norfolk Southern and Pan Am received STB approval of the deal. As of May 1, 2009, each of the two companies owns 50% of Pan Am Southern. PAR's trackage between Ayer, Massachusetts and Mechanicville, New York was transferred to PAS and continued to be operated and maintained by PAR's Springfield Terminal Railway Company subsidiary. NS transferred to PAS cash and property valued at $137.5 million.

Planned improvements to the route included track and signal upgrades, and expansion of terminals, including new automotive and intermodal terminals constructed in Ayer, Massachusetts and Mechanicville, New York.

Planned lines were as follows:

- Rotterdam Junction and Schenectady, New York to CPF 312 (east of Willows, Massachusetts), partially via trackage rights over CP and MBTA (Fitchburg Line)
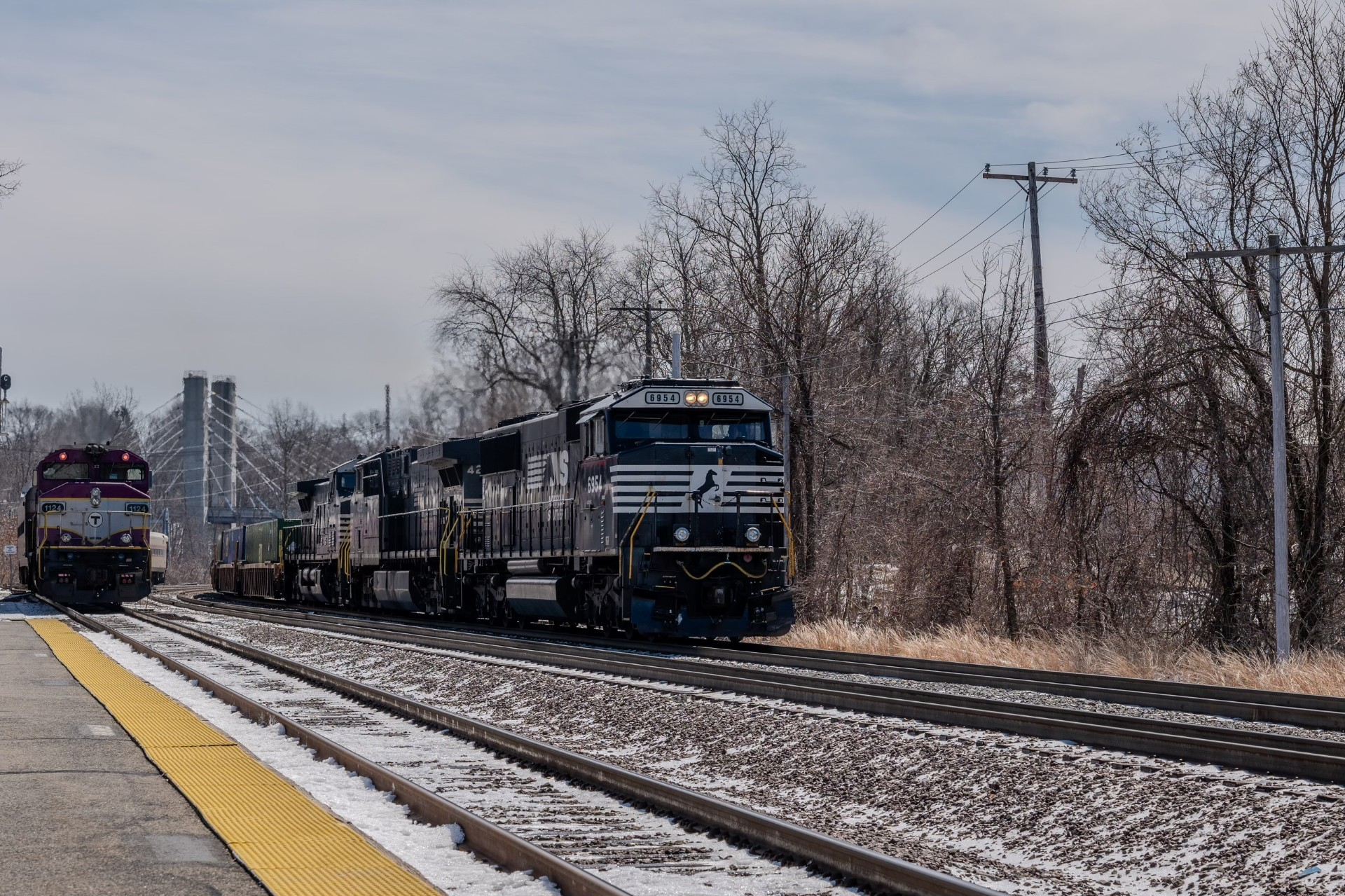
  - A Pan Am Southern train with Norfolk Southern locomotives passes Fitchburg MBTA Station
    Branches from North Adams to Adams, Massachusetts; in Gardner, Massachusetts; from Ayer to Harvard, Massachusetts; from Ayer to West Groton, Massachusetts via MBTA trackage rights; and from Willows to Littleton, Massachusetts via MBTA trackage rights
- White River Junction, Vermont to New Haven, Connecticut, partially via trackage rights over NECR and Amtrak (New Haven-Springfield Line)
  - Branches from Berlin to Derby, Connecticut partially via MNCR (Waterbury Branch) trackage rights; from Plainville to Southington, Connecticut; and from North Haven to Cedar Hill Yard via CSX trackage rights

=== Post Pan Am acquisition by CSX ===
As a result of CSX's purchase of Pan Am Railways in June 2022, Pan Am Southern will no longer be operated by PAR. CSX inherited PAR's 50 percent stake in Pan Am Southern, with competitor Norfolk Southern owning the remaining half. CSX and NS reached an agreement to have Pan Am Southern be operated by a new Genesee & Wyoming (G&W) subsidiary named the Berkshire and Eastern Railroad (B&E), which the Surface Transportation Board (STB) approved.

The United States Department of Justice had recommended that the STB require CSX to sell its stake in PAS as a condition of the merger to prevent a reduction in competition. Railroads in New England, including Vermont Rail System and Canadian Pacific Railway, had also objected to the plan for G&W to operate PAS, as it would give G&W an even more extensive network in the region than it currently has. Canadian Pacific in particular asserted in a filing to the STB that the purchase would give CSX control of both of the primary east to west rail lines in New England and leave other companies at a competitive disadvantage. The STB rejected those arguments.

Berkshire and Eastern Railroad began operating Pan Am Southern on September 1, 2023.

Norfolk Southern re-routed its daily pair of Chicago-New England intermodal trains off of Pan Am Southern's Patriot Corridor and onto CSX's ex-Boston and Albany Railroad mainline starting on January 13, 2026, as part of trackage rights Norfolk Southern obtained when CSX acquired Pan Am Railways. Unlike the Pan Am Southern route, the B&A mainline is fully-cleared for double-stack container trains, and allows for significantly higher tracks speeds of up to 50 miles per hour (80 km/h), compared to 25 miles per hour (40 km/h) on the Pan Am Southern route.
