= Berkshire and Eastern Railroad =

Railroad in New England and New York

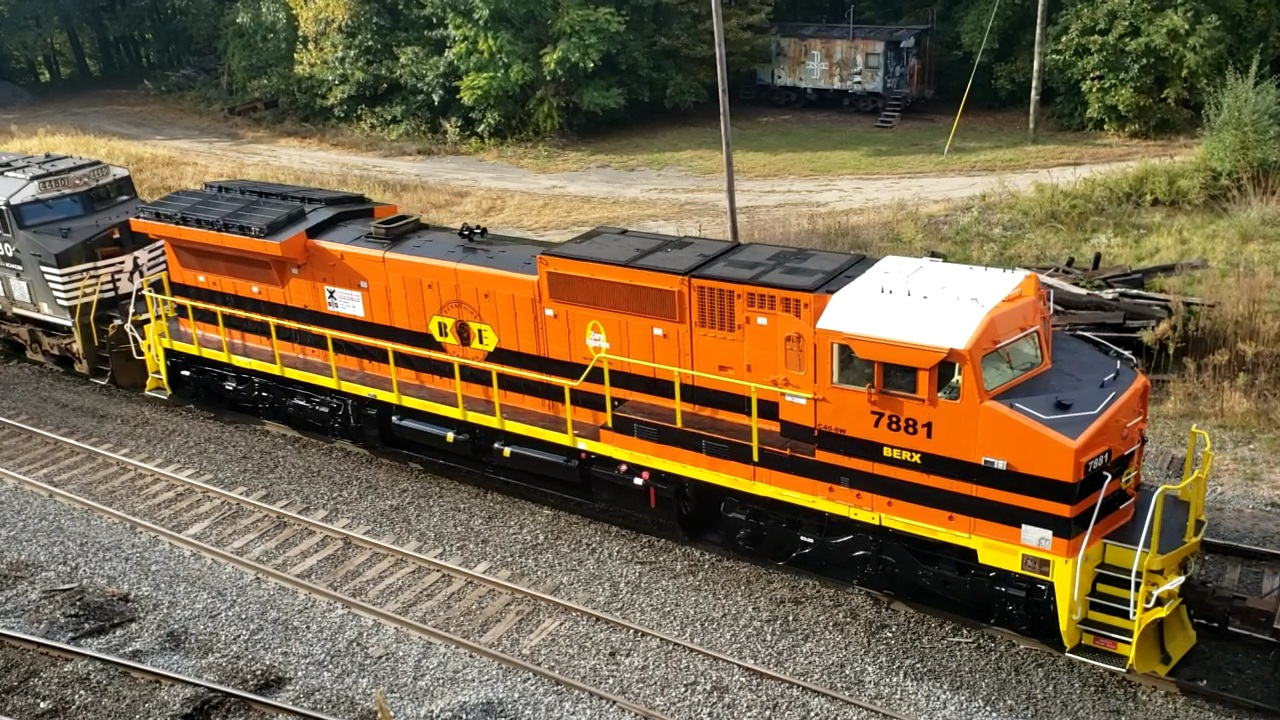
- BERX 7881 in fresh G&W paint leaving East Deerfield Yard on EDMO.

Overview
- Reporting mark: BERX
- Locale: New England, New York
- Dates of operation: 2023–present

Technical
- Track gauge: 4 ft 8 1/2 in (1,435 mm) standard gauge

Other
- Website: https://panamsouthern.com/

The Berkshire and Eastern Railroad (reporting mark BERX) is a shortline railroad in New England and New York, using tracks owned by Pan Am Southern. Pan Am Southern is jointly owned by CSX Transportation (CSXT) and Norfolk Southern Railway (NS).

Following CSXT's purchase of Pan Am Systems, CSXT and NS chose Genesee & Wyoming (GWI) to operate Pan Am Southern. GWI, in turn, selected its Pittsburg and Shawmut Railroad (PSR) subsidiary to operate Pan Am Southern. PSR — doing business as Berkshire & Eastern — will operate, maintain, and market the Pan Am Southern freight rail lines previously operated by Pan Am Railways.

Surface Transportation Board approval of the formation and operation of B&E was contingent on the Board's approval of CSXT's purchase of Pan Am Systems. The Board approved the CSXT–Pan Am deal on April 14, 2022. B&E began operating Pan Am Southern on September 1, 2023.

== Safety and Incidents ==
On February 11, 2025, train B101 derailed on Farley Road in Erving, Massachusetts, shortly before 4:00 p.m. There were no injuries, and no hazardous materials were involved. A video of the derailment, captured by a railfan, was subsequently uploaded to YouTube.
