= Ayer, Massachusetts =

- Town
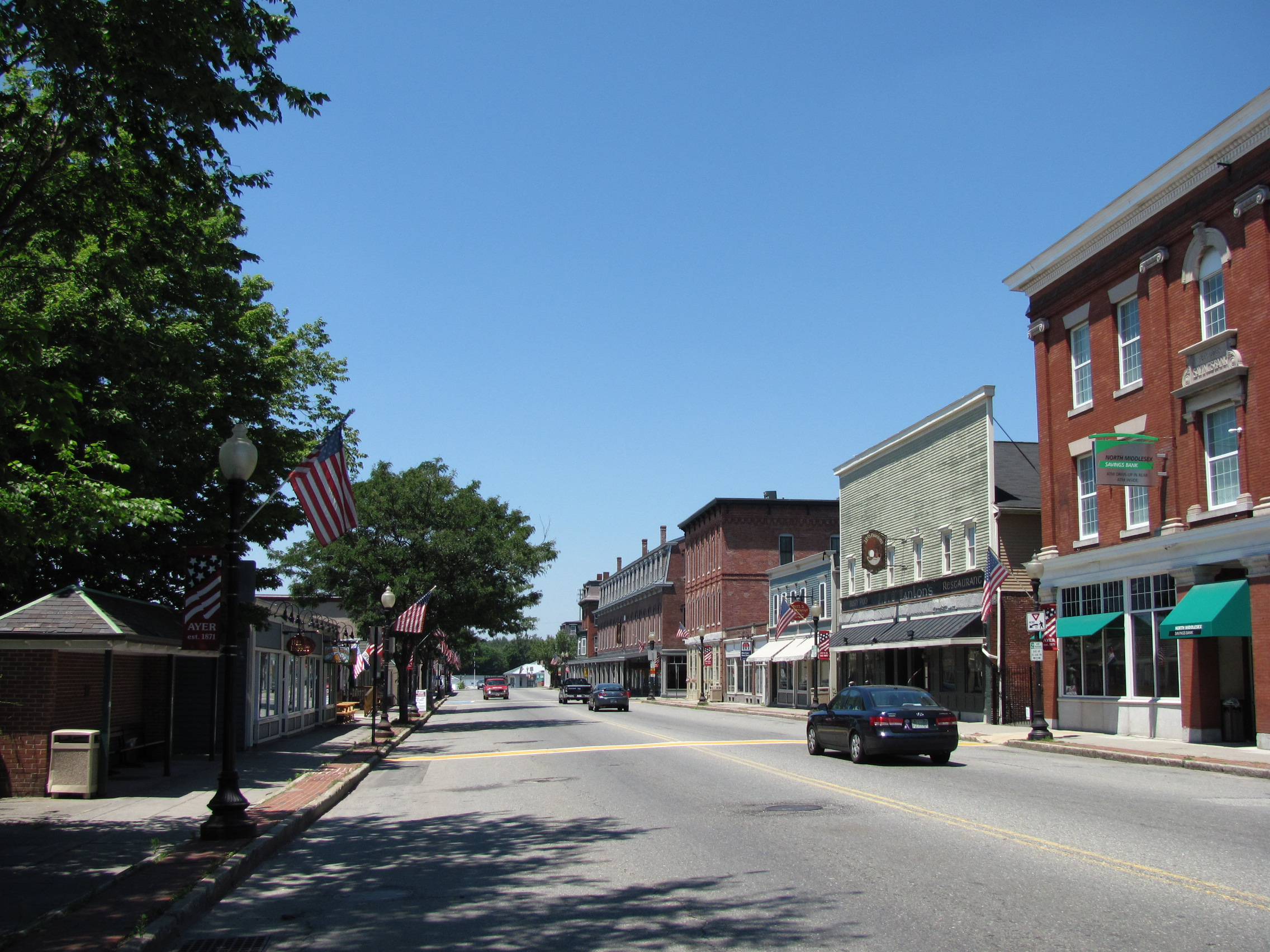
- Main Street

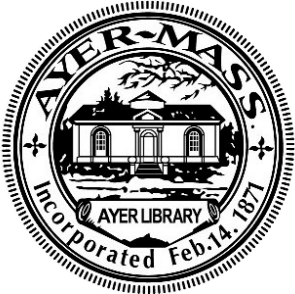
- Seal

- Location in Middlesex County in Massachusetts
- Coordinates: 42°33′40″N 71°35′25″W
- Country: United States
- State: Massachusetts
- County: Middlesex
- Settled: 1668
- Incorporated: February 14, 1871

Government
  - Type: Open town meeting
  - Town Manager: Robert Pontbriand

Area
  - Total: 9.6 sq mi (24.8 km^{2})
  - Land: 9.0 sq mi (23.4 km^{2})
  - Water: 0.54 sq mi (1.4 km^{2})
- Elevation: 226 ft (69 m)

Population (2020)
  - Total: 8,479
  - Density: 938/sq mi (362/km^{2})
- Time zone: UTC−5 (Eastern)
  - Summer (DST): UTC−4 (Eastern)
- ZIP Code: 01432
- Area codes: 351/978
- FIPS code: 25-03005
- GNIS feature ID: 0618215
- Website: www.ayer.ma.us

Ayer (/ɛər/, AIR) is a town in Middlesex County, Massachusetts, United States. Originally part of Groton, it was incorporated February 14, 1871, and became a major commercial railroad junction. It's downtown, largely rebuilt in brick after an 1872 fire, is listed on the National Register of Historic Places as the Ayer Main Street Historic District. A chain of ponds crosses the town to the Nashua River, and the Nashua River Rail Trail begins downtown. The town was home to Camp Stevens, a training camp for Massachusetts volunteers during the American Civil War. Later, Fort Devens was established by the federal government to train New England soldiers for World War I. Part of the former Fort Devens lies within Ayer's historic boundaries and is now the Devens Regional Enterprise Zone. The town's population was 8,479 at the 2020 census. It contains the census-designated places of Ayer and Devens.

== History ==
=== Native American history ===
Ayer was originally inhabited by the Nashaway, a Nipmuc people that inhabited the lands along the Nashua River and its tributaries. A small settlement was located along the banks of the Nonacoicus Brook, located in the western part of the town. The name of the Nashaway village, its people and the brook, pronounced by locals as /ˈnɒ nə ˌkɔɪ ʃəs/, was also recorded in early English sources as 'Nonajcoyjicus,' 'Nonocoyecos,' 'Nonacoiacus' and 'Nonaicoics.' According to the personal manuscripts of Justice Samuel Sewall, best known for his controversial role in the Salem witch trials, he was told sometime in 1698 by Hanah, wife of Sachem Ahaton of the Ponkapoag Massachusett tribe, that the name was actually Nunnacoquis (modern Wôpanâak Massachusett dialect Nunahkuqees /nənahkəkʷiːs/) and signified 'an Indian earthen pot' although literally refers to a 'small dry earthen pot.' The name was likely a reference to a series of small mounds along the banks of the Nonacoicus Brook.

Very little archaeological evidence has been found of settlement in the region, most likely lost to centuries of cultivation and development, although a handful of stone tools or evidence of habitation have been found along the shores of the Nashua River, Nonacoicus Brook, Sandy Pond and Long Pond as well as a rock shelter on Snake Hill. Although some have been dated to the Early Woodland Period (3000-2000 BP), the majority of findings are from the Late Woodland and Early Contact Period (1000-450 BP). In addition, portions of Main Street and Sandy Pond Road are believed to follow the vast network of trails used by Native peoples for trade, travel and communication. The Nashaway likely cultivated corn, beans and squash, but depended on foraging for fruits, nuts, tubers and seeds to supplement their diets. Seasonally, camps were set up in hunting areas, but the most important gatherings were likely the annual spawning migrations of Atlantic salmon, alewife, American shad, blueback herring and sea lamprey that once swam up the Nashua River from the sea via the Merrimack River.

The arrival of English settlers in the seventeenth century was a great disruption. Virgin soil epidemics such as smallpox, leptospirosis, influenza, scarlet fever and measles ravaged Native communities due to their lack of immunity to Old World diseases. The influx of English settlers also led to competition for land and resources and efforts to subjugate and assimilate the Native peoples. The Nashaway were visited by the missionary John Eliot, who had translated the Bible into the Massachusett language, understood throughout New England as a second language. He began teaching Indians to read and write, and to train as missionaries and teachers. Land was set aside for the Indians for the Praying town of Nashoba in what is now neighboring Littleton, Massachusetts, which likely attracted many of the Nashaway families in the surrounding areas. Nashoba was one of fourteen communities in the colony established for the Indian converts, where they came to meld English and traditional ways.

By 1675, the peace between the English settlers and the Native Americans was broken with the uprising of the Wampanoag sachem Metacomet. The Praying Indians, the inhabitants of the Praying towns such as Nashoba, were rounded up by English colonial militias and sent to Deer Island, where most froze or starved to death. Although heavy losses were inflicted on both sides, the English won and executed a vast number of Indians or sold them into slavery in the West Indies. Many left the region and chose to seek safety with the Abenaki and the French colonists in what is now Canada. Nashoba remained in Indian hands until 1736. The Native Americans began to congregate into a smaller number of communities. Three state-recognized tribes of Nipmuc, descended from the remnant communities that survived the epidemics and King Philip's War, include the Chaubunagungamaug Nipmuck of Webster, Massachusetts, the Hassanamisco Nipmuc of Grafton, Massachusetts and the Natick Massachusett-Nipmuc, a Massachusett people of partial Nipmuc ancestry.

=== Founding ===
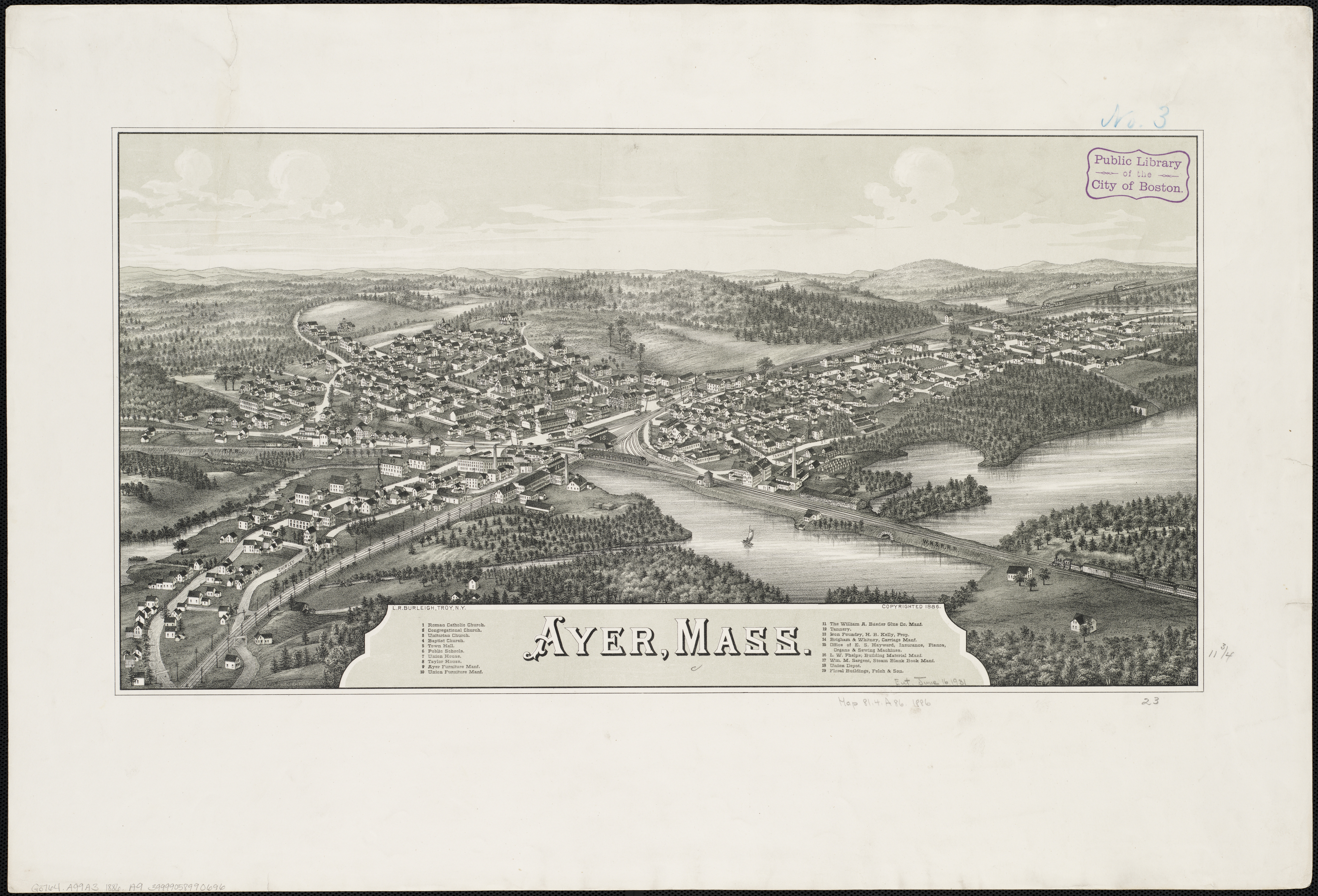
Lithograph of Ayer from 1886 by L.R. Burleigh with list of landmarks

The town of Groton, which originally included Ayer as well as several other towns in the region, was settled by English colonists as early as 1655. The first settlement in the portion of Groton that would become Ayer was in 1667, when a mill was constructed to serve a small hamlet that had developed around the Nonacoicus Brook.

The community eventually came to be known as South Groton, or with the arrival of the railroad, Groton Junction. This area was later partitioned and incorporated as the town of Ayer in 1871. The town was named Ayer in honor of Dr. James Cook Ayer, a prominent resident of Lowell, Massachusetts and one of the wealthiest pharmaceutical manufacturers of his day. Dr. Ayer provided the funding for the construction of the Town Hall.

East Main Street c. 1906

=== Regional rail hub ===
The town's growth was influenced by a period of rapid development of railroad transportation. Though only 9.5 square miles (25 km^{2}) in area, the town became a major junction for both east–west and north–south rail lines, and developed into an important commercial center oriented towards the rail industry. Known as Groton Junction and later Ayer Junction, the intersecting railroads included:

- Fitchburg Railroad in 1844 to Boston and eventually points in New York State (still in operation in 2021 as District 3 (Pan Am Southern) and the MBTA Fitchburg Line To Wachusett).
- Peterborough and Shirley Railroad in 1848 (became part of the Fitchburg Railroad and later the Boston & Maine Railroad. Its northerly terminus was Greenville, New Hampshire. From 1892, the Peterborough and Shirley also connected with the Brookline and Pepperell Railroad to Pepperell and, from 1895, to Milford, NH. In 2021 active rail on what is now known as the Greenville Industrial Track serves two customers on line, both located one mile north of Ayer center. Operational rail ceases at a derelict trestle spanning the Nashua River on the Ayer/Groton border. Tracks are intact to Townsend, Massachusetts.
- Worcester and Nashua Railroad in 1848 (Southern branch still in operation under Pan Am Southern to Worcester to connect with CSX Transportation. Northern end of the branch from Ayer to Nashua, NH abandoned in 1981. The Nashua River Rail Trail has occupied the old right-of-way since 2005)
- Stony Brook Railroad to North Chelmsford, Massachusetts, in 1848 (still in operation in 2021 as District 2 [Pan Am Railways])

The split between the Stony Brook and Fitchburg main line was moved east from the central junction to reduce parallel trackage.

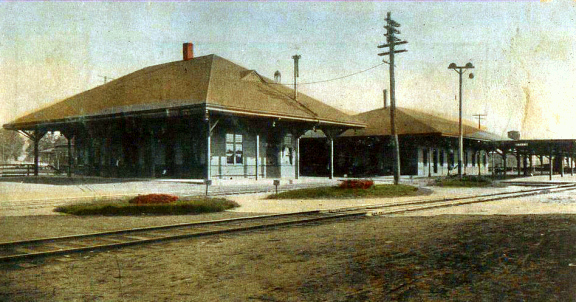
Postcard view showing the two railroad stations that once served Ayer, dated 1910

=== Military history ===
During the Civil War an army training camp, Camp Stevens, was located near the Nashua River. Camp Devens, which eventually became Fort Devens, was established in 1917, during World War I. The presence of thousands of military and civilian personnel on the base shifted Ayer's commercial development towards meeting their needs until Fort Devens was closed in 1996. A smaller Devens Reserve Forces Training Area remains active.

Since the base closed, its land in Ayer, Harvard, and Shirley has been run by MassDevelopment as the Devens Regional Enterprise Zone.

=== 20th Century ===
Record-breaking ski jump. In 1935, the largest Nordic ski jump in North America was constructed at Pingry Hill near the Willows. A 700-foot-high wooden trestle build, the ski jump operated for a single winter season amid the hardships of Great Depression-era Ayer. Part of the structure was blown down by the wind in the summer of 1936 and it was never rebuilt. Some of the lumber was salvaged by local residents over the next few years. As of 2013, no trace of the massive structure remains.

Town Beach. The town beach at Sandy Pond was created by a unanimous Town Meeting vote in 1945. The pond once supported an ice business, and in the late 19th century Bostonians kept summer cabins there. The beach is on the pond's southwestern shore, and parking is limited to residents during swimming season.

Happy Together. Songwriter Alan Gordon said The Turtles' 1967 hit "Happy Together" took shape while he was eating breakfast at the Park Street Diner in Ayer after visiting his father.

Ayer resident wrongly convicted. The Hollywood film Conviction depicted the legal drama surrounding the investigation, conviction and eventual exoneration of Kenneth "Kenny" Waters, for the 1980 murder of Katharina Brow. Waters' sister Betty Anne worked with the Innocence Project, a nonprofit organization devoted to overturning the wrongful convictions using DNA test results as evidence. In 2009 the town and its insurers paid a $3.4 million settlement in response to a civil rights lawsuit by the estate of Kenneth Waters.

Town hosipital. The town's hospital, Community Memorial, occupied a 1929 Colonial Revival building on Winthrop Avenue until 1971; the building, listed on the National Register, now houses an assisted living residence. Its successor, Nashoba Valley Medical Center on Groton Road, closed on August 31, 2024, after its owner, Steward Health Care, filed for bankruptcy.

=== Modern day ===
Within its relatively small area Ayer boasts numerous industries. It's largest industry is manufacturing, particularly food and beverage manufacturing. Pulmuone's Nasoya facility in Ayer boasts the largest tofu production line in the world.

Ayer has many diverse and well-rated restaurants. In 2023, readers of USA Today's 10Best ranked Ayer third among the best small-town food scenes in the United States.

== Geography ==
According to the United States Census Bureau, the town has a total area of 9.6 square miles (24.8 km^{2}), of which 9.0 square miles (23.4 km^{2}) is land and 0.6 square mile (1.4 km^{2}) (5.75%) is water.

Ayer borders the towns of Shirley, Groton, Littleton, and Harvard.

A chain of connected ponds and streams crosses the town. Long Pond flows into Sandy Pond, then Flannagan Pond (also fed by Pine Meadow Pond), Balch Pond, Grove Pond, and Plow Shop Pond, which drains through Nonacoicus Brook to the Nashua River. Sandy and Long ponds are kettle ponds left by the last glaciation. Sandy, Lond, and Spectacle ponds are desginated Great Ponds under state law. Part of Noncoicus Brook lies within the Oxbow National Wildlife Refuge.

== Demographics ==
Historical population
Year	Pop.	±%
1900	2,446	—
1910	2,797	+14.3%
1920	3,052	+9.1%
1930	3,060	+0.3%
1940	3,572	+16.7%
1950	5,740	+60.7%
1960	14,927	+160.1%
1970	8,325	−44.2%
1980	6,993	−16.0%
1990	6,871	−1.7%
2000	7,287	+6.1%
2010	7,427	+1.9%
2020	8,479	+14.2%
2025*	9,267	+9.3%
* = population estimate. Source: United States census records and Population Estimates Program data.

At the 2010 census, there were 7,427 people, 3,118 households and 1,831 families residing in the town. The population density was 825.2 inhabitants per square mile (318.6/km^{2}). There were 3,462 housing units at an average density of 384.7 per square mile (148.5/km^{2}). The racial makeup of the town was 84.3% White, 5.9% African American, 0.3% Native American, 3.6% Asian, 2.3% from other races, and 3.4% from two or more races. Hispanic or Latino of any race were 5.7% of the population.

There were 3,063 households, of which 26.5% had children under the age of 18 living with them, 46.0% were married couples living together, 2.8% had a male householder with no wife present, 11.9% had a female householder with no husband present, and 39.3% were non-families. 32.4% of all households were made up of individuals, and 10.7% had someone living alone who was 65 years of age or older. The average household size was 2.26 and the average family size was 2.86.

Of the 7,427 people in the population, 22.6% were under the age of 18, 7.5% were 15 to 19 years of age, 6.7% were 20 to 24 years of age, 28.1% were 25 to 44 years of age, 28.1% were 45 to 64 years of age, and 11.4% were 65 years and over. The median age was 38.2 years. For every 100 females, there were 101.2 males. For every 100 females 18 years and over there were 97.9 males.

The median household income was $54,899, and the median family income was $78,947. The median income of individuals working full-time was $53,194, for males versus $47,198 for females. The per capita income for the town was $32,179. About 8.0% of families and 12.8% of the population were below the poverty line, including 12.5% of those under age 18 and 9.9% of those age 65 or over.

== Government ==
As a New England town, Ayer has an open town meeting, a three-member Select Board, and a town manager.

== Economy ==
Ayer's largest industry is manufacturing, particularly food and beverage manufacturing. Pulmuone's Nasoya facility in Ayer boasts the largest tofu production line in the world, following a $55 million expansion completed in 2026. Ayer's largest private employer is Catania Oils, a fourth-generation family company and the Northeast's leading producer of edible oils.

== Education ==
=== Public schools ===
Along with the neighboring town of Shirley, Ayer is served by the Ayer Shirley Regional School District.

- Page Hilltop Elementary School
- Ayer Shirley Regional Middle School
- Ayer Shirley Regional High School

Additionally, Ayer is home to the Francis W. Parker Charter Essential School.

=== Colleges ===
After World War II, the army base at Fort Devens was converted into a temporary college campus. Massachusetts State College–Fort Devens operated for three years and was closed after the spring semester in 1949 due to declining attendance.

== Transportation ==
The Montachusett Regional Transit Authority (MART) serves the town of Ayer. The MBTA Commuter Rail's Fitchburg Line provides service to and from North Station in Boston at Ayer station.

Ayer is located on routes 2A, 110, and 111; it is one town away from both Interstate 495 and Route 2.

Freight trains travel daily through Ayer over the tracks of the historic Stony Brook Railroad. Ayer Yard is the interchange between CSX and Pan Am Southern, which Berkshire & Eastern Railroad, a Genesee & Wyoming subsidiary, now operates.

The southern segment of the Nashua River Rail Trail commences in Ayer.

== Points of interest ==
Places on the National Register of Historic Places:

- Community Memorial Hospital – 15 Winthrop Ave.
- Fort Devens Historic District
- Ayer Main Street Historic District – Main St.
- Pleasant Street School – Pleasant St.
- St. Andrew's Church (1892) – 7 Faulkner St.

The Billiards Cafe on Ayer's Main Street is notable as the home of the only full-sized (6 ft by 12 ft) snooker table in New England.

== Notable people ==
- Lee Alexander, bassist
- Bill Aucoin, band manager of Kiss from 1973 to 1982
- Foster Ellenborough Lascelles Beal, naturalist
- C. L. Blood, con artist
- Rita Briggs, an American female baseball catcher who played from 1947 through 1954 for seven different teams in the All-American Girls Professional Baseball League
- Angus Dun, vicar at St. Andrew's Episcopal Church
- Robert Frazier, writer of speculative poetry and fiction
- Mike Gillian, Longwood University head men's basketball coach
- Jamie Morris, National Football League running back
- Joe Morris, National Football League running back
- Betty Anne Waters, a lawyer who was able to exonerate her brother and featured in the 2010 film Conviction
- Norbert Wiener, a child prodigy who graduated from Ayer High School at age 11 and became a pioneering electronics engineer and theorist of computers and cybernetics
