= Railroad pool =

Railroad pools in the United States were associations of competing railroads "for the purpose of a proper division of the traffic at competitive points and the maintenance of equitable rates that may be agreed upon." Louis Boisot Jr., of the Chicago Bar, wrote an article about Railroad Pools. He said “Railroad Pools are contracts between rival railway companies whereby, in order to prevent competition, their business is united in one common total, from which the business or the money received therefor is divided among the combining companies in fixed percentages."

== History ==
In 1885, William H. Vanderbilt the railroad magnate, and Hugh J. Jewett defined railroad pooling in a letter to the Hepburn Committee of the New York legislature, as "a successful plan for preventing railway wars and securing uniformity of rates." During this time, pools were making their way towards legal recognition. In Europe they were encouraged. In Belgium and Prussia the government owned part of the railroads.

In 1887, Congress prohibited pooling agreements between railroads with the enactment of the Interstate Commerce Act of 1887.

== See also ==
- History of rail transport in the United States
