= Timeline of United States railway history =

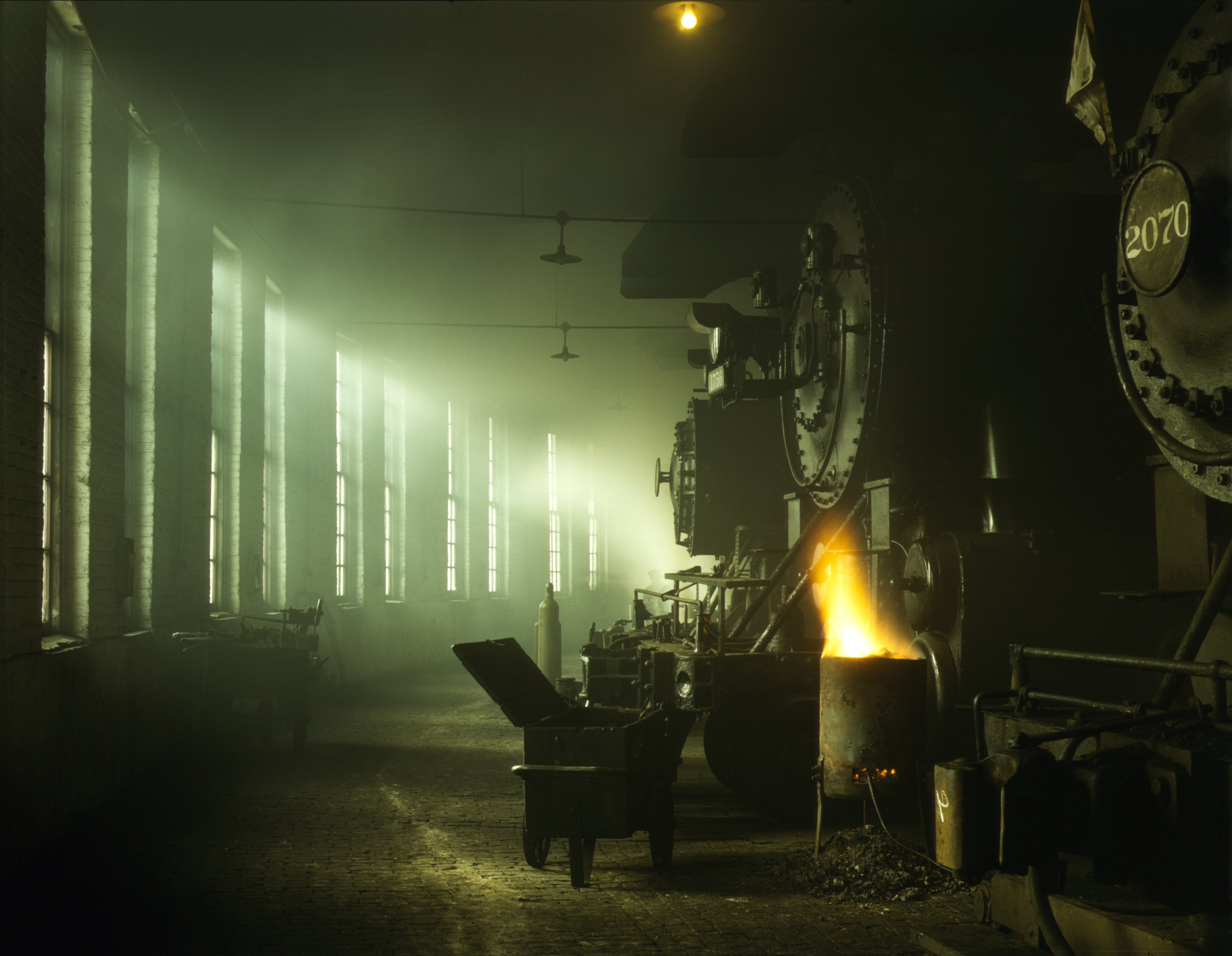
Steam locomotives of the Chicago and North Western Railway in the roundhouse at the Chicago, Illinois rail yards, 1942

The Timeline of U.S. Railway History depends upon the definition of a railway, as follows: A means of conveyance of passengers and goods on wheeled vehicles running on rails, also known as tracks.

== 1795–1829 ==
- 1795–99 & 1799–1804 or '05 — In 1795, Charles Bulfinch, the architect of Boston's famed State House first employed a temporary funicular railway with specially designed dumper cars to decapitate 'the Tremont's' Beacon Hill summit and begin the decades long land reclamation projects which created most of the real estate in Boston's lower elevations of today from broad mud flats, such as South Boston, Eastern parts of Dorchester, much of the shorelines of the entire Charles River basin on both the left and right banks and Brighton from mud flats, and most famously, the Back Bay.
- 1815-1820s One interpretation of historical documents indicates the same equipment was used for a longer, more ambitious period to level and effectively remove 'The Tremont', Copely, Cope's, and Beacon Hills again into what became Boston's Back Bay. These moves were far from completing the project; photos from the 1850s show the majority of the Back Bay was still tidewater.

=== 1810s–1830s ===
- 1800–1825 Various inventors and entrepreneurs make suggestions about building model railways in the United States. Around Coalbrookdale in the United Kingdom, mining railways become increasingly common. An early steam locomotive is given a test run in 1804, but is then wrecked carelessly. For unknown reasons, the inventor does not rebuild it for nearly two decades.
- 1809 Scottsman quarry owner Thomas Leiper, in 1809 when denied a charter to build a canal along the Crum Creek from his quarry to the docks in the tidewater, commissions a 60 yards (55 m) railroad test track in the yard of the Bull's Head Tavern in Philadelphia. The track had a grade of one inch and a half to the yard, with a 4% grade to test whether a horse could successfully pull 10,000 pounds (4,500 kg) against the slope.
- 1810–1829 The Leiper Railroad, a horse-drawn railroad three-quarters of a mile long, opens in 1810 after Thomas Leiper failed to obtain a charter with legal rights-of-way to build his desired canal along Crum Creek. The quarryman's 'make-do' railroad solution was the continent's first chartered railway, first operational non-temporary railway, first well documented railroad, and first constructed railroad also meant to be permanent. It was perhaps the only railroad replaced by a canal, and also one of the first to close, and of those, perhaps is alone in reopening again in 1858.

== 1825–1832 ==
Inspired by the speedy success of the Stockton and Darlington Railway (1825) in England's railway historical record, capitalists in the United States — already embarking upon great public works infrastructure projects to connect the new territories of the United States with the older seaboard cities industries by the canals of America's Canal Age, almost overnight began dreaming up projects using railroads — a technology in its infancy, but one employing steam engines which were rapidly becoming widely known from their successful use on steamboats. American steam engine pioneers were willing to experiment with Heat Engines using higher pressures than the mainly Atmospheric engines still fashionable in Great Britain. The rest of the world lagged the two English speaking nations. Railroads began to be proposed where canals wouldn't do, or would be too costly and with an increase in rolling stock tonnage capacity, locomotive power, and a growing confidence born of experience and new materials in less than three decades, the United States generally would discard canals as the principal design choice in favor of far more capable freight haulage technologies.

- 1825 American John Stevens (inventor), builds a test track and runs a locomotive around it in his summer home estate, Hoboken, New Jersey. This partially settles the tractive power questions, showing that on level track, metal on metal wheels can provide tractive effort and pull a load. The ability for any engine to do so on a grade is still widely doubted in the press and minds of potential investors (pubs, clubs, boardrooms, etc.), while the minds of many potential investors were well aware that most railroads in the capital poor United States would have to surmount significant grades to be useful technology. And while news from Europe was delayed 4–8 weeks, well-connected Americans were aware in general of United Kingdom news coverage and, to a lesser extent, that of continental European developments. In consequence, the 1825 success of the Stockton and Darlington Railway only gradually eroded the three-way nay-sayer beliefs that the careful expensive gentle engineered grades extant in the early British railways was impracticable in most cases in America and that such grades were necessary since steel on iron rails would not provide traction on hills, were it possible to build a locomotive engine powerful enough to surmount such grades. In each case, it would take experience and success against such over at least several months before the misconceptions fell into disdain.
- 1826: The 3 miles (4.8 km) industrial animal powered Granite Railroad opens in Quincy, Massachusetts, to convey quarried granite for the Bunker Hill monument. It later becomes a common carrier railroad.
- 1827: Taking advantage of seasonal freezing of the Lehigh Canal, and with materials prepared in advance, the Lehigh Coal & Navigation Company (LC&N) converts their 1818–19 built uniformly graded wagon road into a gravity railroad in just four months of construction.

During the summer of 1827, (Note: Summer of 1827 is in conflict with highly detailed account by Brenckman and other more local (and more contemporary) historians. Brenckman's detailed account details preparations stockpiling wood, iron, tools and materials over the entire preceding winter and fall with work parties defined and told off with work commencing as soon as soil melts allowed work to lay sleepers in March and April with the aim of not affecting coal deliveries to the canal head, so it could resume operations as soon as ice and flooding permitted. Further, framework, couplings, tires and other iron castings were carried out in the LC&N Co.'s own foundries in Mauch Chunk, the company having financed at least 12 of the first 14 blast furnaces North of Easton — so triggered the iron and steel industries of Bethlehem and Allentown south of the Blue Ridge escarpment.) a railroad was built from the mines at Summit Hill to Mauch Chunk. With one or two unimportant exceptions, this was the first railroad in the United States.

— James E. Held, Archaeology

The resultant Summit Hill & Mauch Chunk Railroad, where mules rode special cars down as well, after the coal hoppers, then returned empties up the nine mile return trip, became the first U.S. railway to carry passengers in the same year of 1827. In less than two years the railway was attracting so many visitors, it began charging fares, and then added and operated special tourism excursions on Sunday as a tourist road — which role it carried into 1932 as the world's acknowledged first roller coaster. In 1847 the cable railway return track was constructed with planes climbing two prominences along Pisgah Ridge, shortening the up trip to twenty minutes from nearly four hours by mule.

1830s

- The Baltimore and Ohio is incorporated in 1827 and officially opens in 1830. Other railroads soon follow, including the Camden and Amboy by 1832.
- August 8, 1829: The Stourbridge Lion, first steam locomotive imported into the US, is tested along tracks built by the Delaware and Hudson company. Deemed too heavy for the company's rails, it and its three brethren are converted to stationary engines for cable railway parts of the transportation system.
- 1830 ushers in a flurry of railroad incorporations, charter applications, grants and beginnings of construction. The B&O opens its first 13 miles (21 km) stretch to Ellicott's Mills and begins regular scheduled passenger services on schedule, May 24, 1830.
- 1830: The 26 miles (42 km) Beaver Meadows Railroad from Beaver Meadows, Pennsylvania, is incorporated and constructed to open a second major coal field to the Lehigh Canal at Parryville beyond the Lehigh Gap. This would form the seed company of the first class Lehigh Valley Railroad after the 1870s.

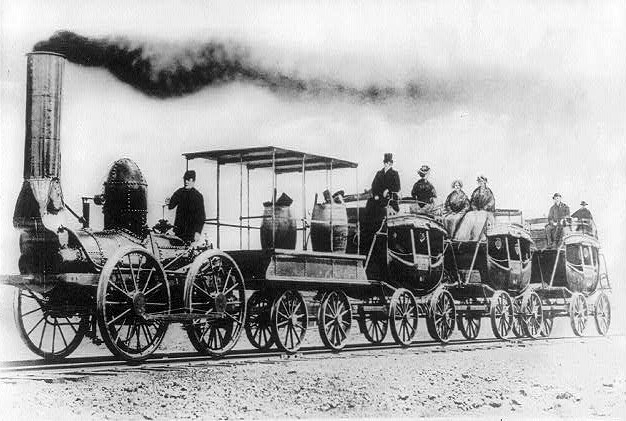
The DeWitt Clinton as it would have appeared on its inaugural run in 1831.

- 1831: The DeWitt Clinton locomotive, built by the West Point Foundry in New York for the Mohawk and Hudson Railroad, made its first test run on July 2, 1831.
- 1830s–1860s: Enormous railway building booms in the United States. The mill owners of Lowell and New Hampshire launch the Boston and Lowell Railroad to parallel the historic Middlesex Canal, which had enabled their mills success; this is the first direct attack rail companies mounted against canal interests.

Railroads gradually replace canals as the first-choice mode of transportation infrastructure to champion and build, while canals hold a whip hand on economy for decades more, but falter on flexible destinations, speed, and where they suffer seasonal stoppages yet service year round needs. By the 1860s, in any case, where all the important older canals were to be found any canal with functions satisfiable by parallel railways (excepting by definition, ship canals) is eyed by investors to be supplanted by a competing railroad. The idea of a rail network in the US, which is by then showing early signs some areas have overbuilt in the Eastern United States is still not a common business model. Cut throat competitive capitalism, not co-operation are the rule, and the decade kicks off the forty years or so of the robber barons and excesses in capitalism.

== 1850–1900 ==
- 1854 Indianapolis' Union Station, the first "union station" in the world, opened by the Terre Haute & Richmond, Madison & Indianapolis, and Bellefontaine railroads.
- 1862 Chattanooga The Great Locomotive Chase, in which Union raiders led by James J. Andrews commandeered a 4-4-0 American locomotive, "The General" and attempted to sabotage Confederate tracks, telegraph lines, and bridges to prevent Confederate troops from moving by rail to Chattanooga.
- 1865: George Pullman becomes well known for luxury sleeping cars, called Pullman cars in his honor, after he loaned one of his cars to be in the funeral train of Abraham Lincoln from Chicago to Springfield, IL.
- 1869: Union Pacific and Central Pacific complete first transcontinental railway link at Promontory Summit.
- 1869: George Westinghouse establishes the Westinghouse Air Brake Company.
- 1870s: Railroads begin to install automatic block signals which improve safety, allow faster train speeds, and allow more efficient utilization of trackage.
- 1870s and 1880s: Strikes break out against railroads and the Pullman Palace Car Company. Corporations hire Pinkerton guards to break up the strikes. Nonetheless, much violence occurs in the strikes. Many people were killed, buildings and rolling stock were burned, and reports of rioting shocked middle-class Americans.
- 1883: Standard time zones adopted by railroads.
- 1886: Many southern states convert from broad gauges such as 1,524 mm (5 ft) to standard gauge 1,435 mm (4 ft 8 1/2 in). (See also Broad gauge#United States.)
- 1887: Congress creates the Interstate Commerce Commission (ICC) to regulate railroads and ensure fair prices.
- 1891: Webb C. Ball establishes first Railway Watch official guidelines for railroad chronometers.
- 1893: Railroad Safety Appliance Act requires air brakes and automatic couplers on all trains, which greatly reduces railroad worker injuries and deaths.
- 1896: Supreme Court rules in United States v. Gettysburg Electric Ry. Co. that the Takings Clause under eminent domain could be applied for historic preservation

== 1900–1970 ==
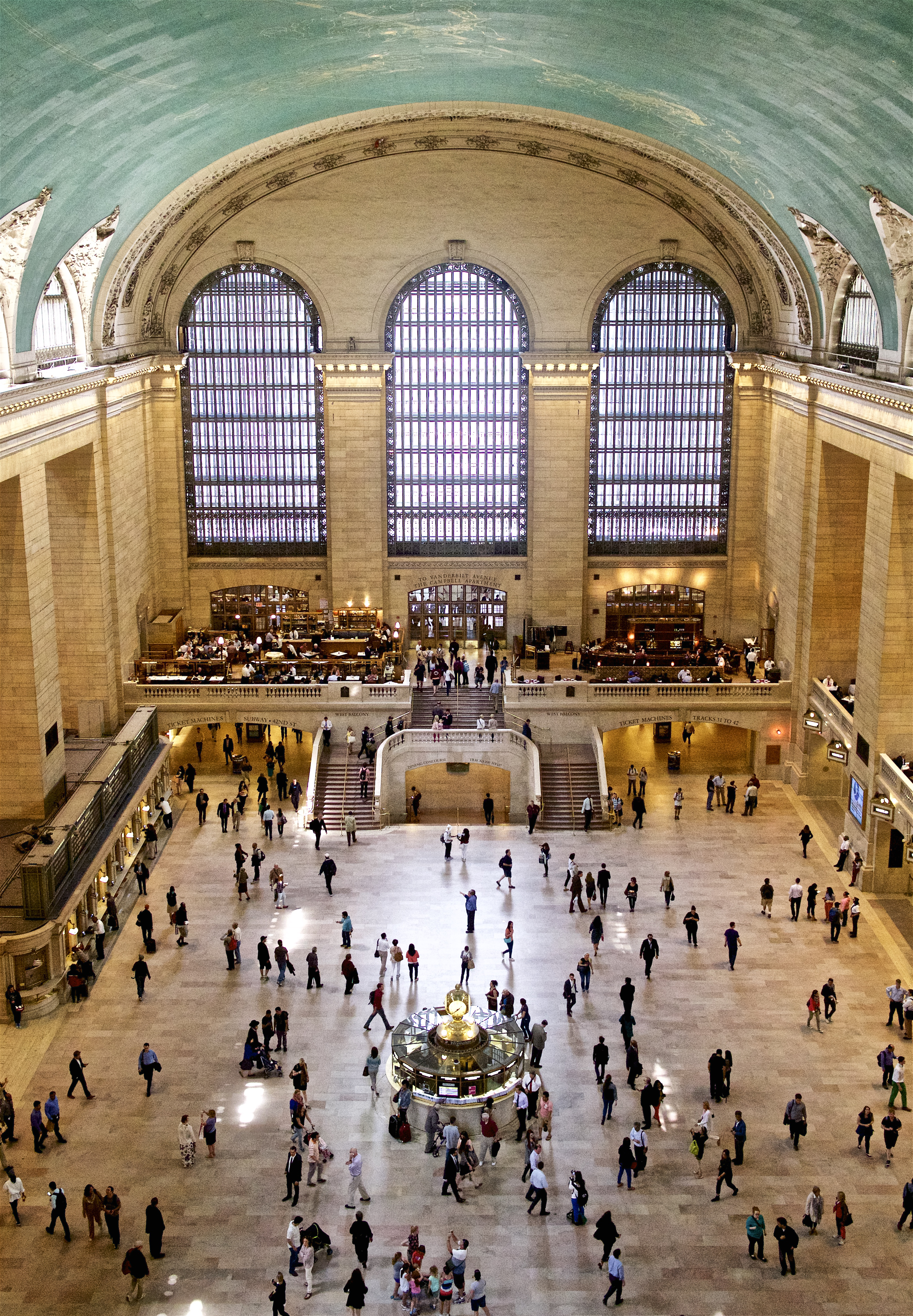
Main Concourse of Grand Central Terminal, which first opened in 1913.

- 1901: Nine locomotive manufacturing companies are combined in a merger to form the American Locomotive Company (ALCO).
- 1902: 20th Century Limited inaugurated by the New York Central Railroad.
- 1910s: Pennsylvania Railroad builds Pennsylvania Station in New York City; New York Central builds current version of Grand Central Terminal.
- 1911: The Delaware Lackawanna and Western Railroad completes the Lackawanna Cut-Off in Northwestern New Jersey and Northeastern Pennsylvania.
- 1916: US railroad trackage was 230,468.32 mi (370,902.81 km), the highest in history. The trackage would increase to over 300,000 mi by the next decade.
- 1917: President Woodrow Wilson orders nationalization of the railroads shortly after the US enters World War I. The United States Railroad Administration manages the system until 1920, when Congress returns control to the railroad companies.
- 1920s and 1930s: Automobiles, airplanes and the Great Depression contribute to a decline in railroad ridership and mileage.
- 1926: Congress passes the Railway Labor Act to settle disputes and avoid strikes (law amended in 1934 and 1936).
- 1934: Burlington railroad's Pioneer Zephyr completes its inaugural run from Denver, Colorado, to Chicago, Illinois, first diesel-powered streamliner in America.
- May 12, 1936: The Santa Fe railroad inaugurates the all-Pullman Super Chief between Chicago and Los Angeles.
- 1940s: World War II brings railroads the highest ridership in American history, as soldiers are being sent to fight overseas in the Pacific Theater and the European Theater. However, automobile travel causes ridership to decline after the war ends.
- March 20, 1949: The Chicago, Burlington & Quincy Railroad, Denver & Rio Grande Western Railroad and Western Pacific Railroad jointly launch the California Zephyr between Chicago and San Francisco as the first passenger train to include Vista Dome cars in regular service.
- 1950s and 1960s: Drastic decline in passenger travel in the United States, due to automobiles and also airplanes, as first jetliners take to the air. Railroads respond through mergers and attempts to shed unprofitable trains and rail routes. The speed of these efforts is reduced through the difficulties of Interstate Commerce Commission hearings.
- 1957: The Nashville, Chattanooga & St. Louis Railway is absorbed into its parent road the Louisville & Nashville Railroad.
- December 1, 1959: ICC approved Virginian Railway merger into Norfolk & Western begins modern-day period of railroad mergers and consolidation.
- July 1, 1967: Rivals Atlantic Coast Line and Seaboard Air Line merge to form Seaboard Coast Line after 9 years of negotiations and ICC hearings.
- August 1, 1967: UAC TurboTrain maiden voyage.
- December 3, 1967: 20th Century Limited makes last run.
- February 1968: Pennsylvania Railroad and New York Central merge to form Penn Central. The New Haven was added in 1969.

== 1970–present ==
- 1970s: Era of deregulation.
- March 1, 1970 Burlington Northern is created with the consolidation of the *Chicago Burlington & Quincy, Great Northern, Northern Pacific and Spokane Portland & Seattle railroads.
- March 22, 1970: The California Zephyr, on its last run, arrives in Oakland, California, from Chicago; the train name will soon be resurrected by Amtrak on a train travelling almost the same route as the original train.
- June 21, 1970 the Penn Central files for Chapter 7 bankruptcy, becoming the largest corporate failure up to that time in US history.
- May 1, 1971: Amtrak created by act of Congress to assume and operate a national network of passenger trains from private railroads after years of dropping ridership and massive deficits force railroads to drop passenger service and ask for government help.
- March 1972: the Gulf Mobile & Ohio is merged into the Illinois Central, forming the Illinois Central Gulf.
- 1970s: Conrail is created from the remains of the bankrupt Penn Central, Erie Lackawanna, Central of New Jersey, Reading and Lehigh Valley Railroads in the Northeast, beginning operations April 1, 1976.
- 1970s and 1980s: Amtrak introduces double-deck Superliner rolling stock. Auto-Train Corporation begins running as independent line (1971), but fails in 1981; In 1983, Amtrak revives service and runs slightly renamed "Auto Train" as one of its more-heavily promoted lines.
- 1977: Amtrak carried 19.2 million passengers an average of 226 miles.
- 1980: Railroads deregulated by Congress by Staggers Rail Act of 1980.
- March 1, 1980, the Rock Island ceases operations after bankruptcy liquidation.
- September 15, 1981: The John Bull becomes the oldest operable steam locomotive in the world when it runs under its own power inside Washington, DC.
- 1981: Union Pacific 3985 is restored to operating condition, making it the largest operable steam locomotive in the world.
- July 1, 1982, Norfolk & Western and Southern Railway merge to form Norfolk Southern.
- January 1, 1986: The Milwaukee Road is merged into the Soo Line Railroad in the largest railroad bankruptcy proceedings to date.
- July 1, 1986, Seaboard System and Chessie System merge to form CSX Transportation corp.
- 1990s: Amtrak funding comes under heavier scrutiny by Congress, while Amtrak plans new routes such as the Acela.
- 1995: ICC abolished; Congress creates Surface Transportation Board to assume the remaining regulatory functions.
- 1997–99: Conrail assets sold to Norfolk Southern Railway and CSX Transportation.
- December 11, 2000: Amtrak's Acela Express makes its first revenue run. It is the first high-speed passenger service in the United States.
- September 11, 2001: Terrorists destroy World Trade Center in New York and destroy part of the PATH system in the process. Full PATH service resumed November 23, 2003.
- 2008: Rail Safety Improvement Act of 2008 enacted by Congress
- 2015: Total rail traffic declined 2.5 percent to 28 million carloads. Coal remains the largest volume, at 5.1 million carloads. Coal volume fell 12 percent in 2015, as natural gas replaces coal and electricity plants. The lower volume allowed better service and faster speed, but low fuel prices are giving an advantage to trucking.
- January 13, 2018: Brightline begins passenger service between Fort Lauderdale and West Palm Beach, Florida.
- March 2020: Most passenger rail operators reduce or completely suspend service in response to the COVID-19 pandemic.
- January 1, 2021: Moynihan Train Hall opens in New York City, partially replacing New York Penn Station.
- December 2021: Kansas City Southern Railway is purchased by Canadian Pacific Railway. The combined systems operate as Canadian Pacific Kansas City.

== See also ==
- History of rail transport in the United States
  - 2008 in rail transport in the United States
  - 2009 in rail transport in the United States
  - 2010 in rail transport in the United States
  - 2014 in rail transport in the United States
  - 2015 in rail transport in the United States
  - 2016 in rail transport in the United States
  - 2017 in rail transport in the United States
  - 2018 in rail transport in the United States
  - 2019 in rail transport in the United States
  - 2020 in rail transport in the United States
  - 2021 in rail transport in the United States
  - 2022 in rail transport in the United States
  - 2023 in rail transport in the United States
  - 2024 in rail transport in the United States
  - 2025 in rail transport in the United States
  - 2026 in rail transport in the United States
  - 2027 in rail transport in the United States
- Oldest railroads in North America
- Timeline of railway history
- Timeline of transportation technology
