= 2020 in rail transport in the United States =

The following are events related to Rail transportation in the United States that happened in 2020.

== Events ==
=== January ===
- (Pennsylvania) January 26 – SEPTA temporarily discontinues the Girard Avenue Trolley in Philadelphia for a period of at least 18 months due to rolling stock maintenance issues as well as track repairs and highway expansion.

=== June ===
- (California) June 13 – The Berryessa segment of the Silicon Valley BART extension is opened to the public.

=== September ===
- September 22– N Line commuter rail in Denver, Colorado opened.

=== October ===
- October 5 – Amtrak begins reducing frequencies on most long-distance routes from daily to tri-weekly.

=== December ===
- December 31– Deadline for mainline American railroads to implement positive train control systems on their networks.
