= 2009 in rail transport in the United States =

The following are events related to rail transportation in the United States that happened in 2009.

== Events ==
=== January ===
- (United States) January 23 – Canadian National Railway closes on purchase of Elgin, Joliet and Eastern Railway.

=== February ===
- February 2 – opening of WES Commuter Rail line from Wilsonville, Oregon, to Beaverton; see https://trimet.org for more information.

=== March ===
- (New York (state)) March 16 – reopening of New York City's South Ferry Station after four years of renovation.

=== May ===
- (United States) May 1 – Pan Am Southern, a joint venture between Pan Am Railways and Norfolk Southern Railway, begins operation.

=== July ===
- (Washington (state)) July 18 – Sound Transit Central Link light rail line in Seattle, Washington opens, utilizing the Downtown Seattle Transit Tunnel.

=== August ===
- (Oregon) August 30 – new Portland Transit Mall light-rail alignment opens for service, initially (until September 12) used only by the MAX Yellow Line.

=== September ===
- September 12 – MAX Green Line light rail line in Portland, Oregon, opens, transporting riders from Portland State University to Clackamas Town Center Transit Center.

=== December ===
- December – construction to restore the mainline of the Virginia and Truckee Railroad from Gold Hill to Carson City, Nevada completed.
- (Illinois) December 31 – Chicago Transit Authority's Brown Line capacity expansion project completed.
