= 2023 in rail transport in the United States =

The following are events related to Rail transportation in the United States that happened in 2023.

== Events ==
=== January ===
- (California) January 7 – Line T Third Street of the San Francisco Muni Metro rerouted via the Central Subway to Chinatown station with 4 new stations.
- (New York (state)) January 25 – MTA Long Island Rail Road opens shuttle service between Jamaica and Grand Central Madison via the East Side Access.

=== February ===
- (New York (state)) February 27 – MTA Long Island Rail Road begins full service to Grand Central Madison via the East Side Access.

=== March ===
- (New York (state)) March 10 – R211A cars enter passenger service on the A line of the MTA New York City Subway.

=== April ===
- April 14 – Canadian Pacific and Kansas City Southern merge to form CPKC.

=== June ===
- (California) June 16 – Los Angeles Metro Rail: A Line extends from 7th Street/Metro Center to APU/Citrus College via the Regional Connector with 2 new stops, E Line extends from 7th Street/Metro Center to Atlantic via the Regional Connector, and L Line ends service.
- (Hawaii) June 30 – Honolulu Skyline opens on the island of Oʻahu with 9 stations between Kualakaʻi and Hālawa.

=== September ===
- (Washington (state)) September 16 – T Line of the Link light rail system extends from Theater District to St. Joseph with 7 new stations.
- (Florida) September 22 – Brightline extends from West Palm Beach 1 stop north to Orlando International Airport.

=== October ===
- (California) October 23 – Vista Canyon Multi-Modal Center opens as an infill station on the Antelope Valley Line
- October 29– L-Line of Milwaukee's The Hop opens for limited commercial operation between Wisconsin Ave and Lakefront with 3 new stations eventually opening.
