= 2027 in rail transport in the United States =

The following are events related to Rail transportation in the United States that happen in 2027.

== Future events ==
=== March ===
- – Rockford Intercity Passenger Rail of the Metra commuter network opens from Chicago to Rockford.

=== October ===
- – Metro-North Railroad: New Canaan Line, Danbury Line, Waterbury Line and New Haven Line some lines are diverted to Penn Station instead of Grand Central.

=== Unknown date ===
- – Amtrak New Orleans–Baton Rouge Passenger Rail is scheduled to open between New Orleans and Baton Rouge.
- – SkyLink people mover is expected to open at Los Angeles International Airport.
- – Amtrak Northeast Regional extends to New River Valley from Roanoke.
- – Amtrak Quad Cities is scheduled to open between Chicago and Moline.
- – Green Line of the Minneapolis Metro Light Rail extends to Southwest from Target Field.
- – New Portal North Bridge is scheduled to open between Newark and New York City.
- – Omaha Streetcar is scheduled to open between CHI Health Center and 42nd St.
- – D Line of Los Angeles Metro Rail extends to Century City from Wilshire/La Cienega.
- – Coaster extends to Downtown San Diego from Santa Fe Depot.
- – S-Line streetcar is to be extended to Highland from Fairmont.
