= 2025 in rail transport in the United States =

The following are events related to Rail transportation in the United States in 2025.

== Events ==
=== March ===
- (Massachusetts) March 24 – As part of the South Coast Rail project, the Fall River/New Bedford Line of the MBTA opens from Boston to New Bedford and Fall River with 6 new stations.

=== April ===
- (Pennsylvania) April 3 – Franklin Square station on the PATCO Speedline opens after being closed for the third time in 1979.

=== May ===
- (Washington (state)) May 10 – 2 Line of Link light rail extends to Downtown Redmond 2 stops north from Redmond Technology.
- (California) May 31 – Sonoma–Marin Area Rail Transit extends 1 stop north to Windsor from Sonoma County Airport.

=== June ===
- (California) June 6 – Los Angeles Metro Rail: The C Line extends 1 stop to the LAX/Metro Transit Center from Aviation/Century and the K Line extends to Aviation/Century from Westchester/Veterans.
- (Arizona) June 7 – B Line of Valley Metro Rail opens 8 new stations from the Downtown Phoenix Hub to Baseline/Central Avenue.

=== July ===
- (Illinois) July 20 – Phase 1 of the Red and Purple Modernization Project is completed on the Red and Purple lines on the Chicago L, with 4 stations being rebuilt with ADA accessibility.

=== August ===
- (Louisiana) (Mississippi) (Alabama) August 18 – Amtrak Mardi Gras Service opens between New Orleans and Mobile with 5 new stations.
- (Washington, D.C.) (Maryland) (Delaware) (Pennsylvania) (New Jersey) (New York (state)) (Connecticut) (Rhode Island) (Massachusetts) August 28 – First five Avelia Liberty trains enter service along the Northeast Corridor.

=== September ===
- September 13 – The first hydrogen train in the United States begins operations on Arrow between San Bernardino and Redlands, California.
- (California) September 19 – A Line of Los Angeles Metro Rail extends to Pomona North from APU/Citrus College, serving 4 new stations.
- (New York (state)) September 22 – New SC42-DM locomotives entered service on Metro-North Hudson Line.

=== October ===
- (Hawaii) October 16– Honolulu Skyline extends 4 stations southeast from Hālawa to Kahauiki.
- (Missouri) October 24 – KC Streetcar extends 8 stations south to UMKC from Union Station.
- (Texas) October 25 – Silver Line opens between Dallas Fort Worth International Airport and Plano with 6 brand new stations.

=== November ===
- (Pennsylvania) November 18 – Pittsburgh International Airport People Mover is permanently decommissioned.

=== December ===
- (Washington (state)) December 6– 1 Line of Link light rail extends to Federal Way Downtown from Angle Lake, adding 3 stations southbound from Seattle.
- (New York (state)) December 8 – Buffalo Metro Rail extends 1 stop to DL&W from Canalside.
