= 2022 in rail transport in the United States =

The following are events related to Rail transportation in the United States that happened in 2022.

== Events ==
=== March ===
- (Massachusetts) March 21 – The Union Square Branch of the MBTA subway's Green Line Extension opens in Somerville with 1 new stop.

=== May ===
- May 20 – The Tempe Streetcar opens in Tempe, Arizona with 13 new stations.
- July 29 – Amtrak extends the Ethan Allen Express 3 stops north to Union Station in Burlington, Vermont.

=== August ===
- (Pennsylvania) August 21 – The SEPTA Regional Rail Media/Elwyn Line is extended 1 stop west from Elwyn to Wawa, and the line is renamed the Media/Wawa Line.

=== September ===
- September 30– All rail service between Irvine and Oceanside, California was suspended due to coastal erosion under the track in San Clemente. Service along the Surf Line was restored the following April.

=== October ===
- (New York (state)) October 3 – The Long Island Rail Road's Third Track Project between Floral Park and Hicksville is completed.
- (California) October 7 – The northern portion of the Los Angeles Metro Rail's K Line opens after several delays with 7 new stations.
- (California) October 24 – Arrow begins service in Redlands, Californiaalongside 4 new stations.

=== November ===
- (Virginia) November 15 – The Washington Metro Silver Line is extended to Ashburn via Dulles International Airport with 6 new stations.
- (California) November 19 – Central Subway in San Francisco opens with 4 new stations after repeated delays.

=== December ===
- December 12 – Opening of the Medford Branch of the Green Line Extension with 5 new stations to Somerville and Medford, Massachusetts.
- (Arizona) December 20 – The PHX Sky Train is extended 2 stops west from Terminal 3 to Rental Car Center.
- (Florida) December 21 – Brightline opens new infill stations at Aventura and Boca Raton.
