= 2016 in rail transport in the United States =

The following are events related to rail transportation in the United States that happened in 2016.

== January ==
- (Virginia) (Washington, D.C.) (Maryland) January 22–24 – In anticipation of heavy snowfall and preparation for the effects of winter storm Jonas, WMATA shuts down all services for the weekend. Metrorail services are suspended completely for two days and restored to normal service in phases up until January 29. During the shutdown, trains are stored in the system's subway tunnels to shelter them from the storm.
- (Washington (state)) January 23 – The First Hill Streetcar line opens in Seattle.

== February ==
- (Washington, D.C.) February 27 – The DC Streetcar opens in Washington, D.C., after several years of delays.

== March ==
- March 5 – The Gold Line Foothill Extension in Los Angeles County, California opens, extending the Metro Rail light rail system by 11.5 miles (18.5 km) to Azusa, California.
- (Virginia) (Washington, D.C.) (Maryland) March 16 – The entire Washington Metro system, the second-largest subway system in the United States, is shut down on a weekday for 24 hours during emergency inspections of jumper cables in tunnels. The shutdown follows an electrical fire caused by a jumper cable two days prior.
- March 19
  - The first phase of Valley Metro Rail's Northwest Extension in Phoenix, Arizona opens.
  - (Washington (state)) Sound Transit opens a Link light rail extension in Seattle, Washington to the University of Washington campus.

== April ==
- April 22 – The A Line in Denver, Colorado, an electrified commuter rail link between Union Station and Denver International Airport owned by RTD, begins service.

== May ==
- May 20 – The second phase of the Expo Line light rail in Los Angeles, California opens, extending the line to Santa Monica.

== June ==
- (Virginia) (Washington, D.C.) (Maryland) June 4 – Beginning of "SafeTrack" program by the Washington Metropolitan Area Transit Authority, to conduct emergency maintenance on the aging Washington Metro system, with expected single-tracking and shutdowns scheduled to last until March 2017.
- June 6 – Opening of the Perris Valley extension of the 91/Perris Valley Line, a commuter rail line operated by Metrolink in Southern California, from Riverside to Perris.

== July ==
- July 25 – Opening of the B Line commuter rail system in Denver, Colorado.

== September ==
- (Ohio) September 9 – Cincinnati Bell Connector opens to the public with a free-ride weekend after years of planning and building, bringing streetcar service back to Cincinnati for the first time since the 1950s.
- (Washington (state)) September 24 – Angle Lake station near Seattle, Washington opens, extending Link light rail service past SeaTac Airport.
- September 30 – The Wachusett station near Boston, Massachusetts, begins limited service, with full service beginning in November. The new station extends the MBTA Commuter Rail system by 4.5 miles (7.2 km).

== October ==
- October 24 – Opening of the South Oak Cliff extension of the Dallas Area Rapid Transit Blue Line to University of North Texas at Dallas.
