= 2008 in rail transport in the United States =

The following are events related to rail transportation in the United States that happened in 2008.

== Events ==
=== March ===
- March 9 – Sprinter starts service between Oceanside and Escondido, California, reinstating passenger service on the Escondido branch line.

=== April ===
- April 26 – FrontRunner, a new commuter rail service, begins running in Utah.

=== November ===
- November – Voter approval of Measure M in Los Angeles County, California, commits additional tax dollars to transit projects.

=== December ===
- December 27 – The first section of the new Valley Metro Rail system, part of Valley Metro in Phoenix, Arizona, opened.
