= 2021 in rail transport in the United States =

The following are events related to Rail transportation in the United States that happened in 2021.

== Events ==
=== April ===
- (Texas) April 12 – Hidden Ridge station opens on the DART Orange Line

=== August ===
- August 30 – Opening of the Center City Corridor expansion of LYNX streetcar service in Charlotte, North Carolina.

=== October ===
- (Washington (state)) October 2 – Opening of the Northgate Link extension in Seattle.

=== November ===
- (Washington (state)) November 18 – Amtrak Cascades service restarts over the Point Defiance Bypass. The rail line was closed in 2017 after the service's inaugural run through the corridor resulted in a derailment.
- November 21 – The Mid-Coast Trolley extension of the San Diego Trolley Blue Line opens for service in San Diego, California.
