= 2010 in rail transport in the United States =

The following are events related to rail transportation in the United States that happened in 2010.

== Events ==
=== June ===
- (New York (state)) June 25 – The Brown M, V, and W of the New York City Subway make their last rides.

=== August ===
- (Colorado) August 26 - Construction began on the 23-mile (37 km) long East Corridor in Denver, connecting the International Airport with Union Station. Construction is scheduled to end sometime in 2015.

=== October ===
- (Illinois) October 4 - New restrooms, a larger waiting area, and the re-installation of air conditioning fans first removed in the 1960s are announced as part of Amtrak's Capital funding project for Chicago Union Station
- (New York (state)) October 7 - Construction of the planned Mass Transit Tunnel running under the Hudson River and leading into Penn Station is cancelled after a thirty-day risk review by New Jersey Transit and Federal Transit Administration officials revealed costs could exceed as much as double its $8.7bn budget.
- (Pennsylvania) (Delaware) (New Jersey) October 29 - SEPTA's Silverliner V cars in service.
