= 2017 in rail transport in the United States =

The following are events related to rail transportation in the United States that happened in 2017.

== Events ==
=== January ===
- (New York (state)) January 1 – Phase I of New York City's Second Avenue Subway is opened for revenue service after almost a century of planning.
- (Texas) January 11 - the Houston METRORail Green Line is extended from Altic/Howard Hughes station to Magnolia Park Transit Center.

=== February ===
- February 24 – The R Line and H Line extensions open as part of the FasTracks project in Denver, Colorado.

=== March ===
- March 25 – The Warm Springs station opens as part of the Bay Area Rapid Transit system in the San Francisco Bay Area, California.

=== May ===
- (Michigan) May 12 – Opening of Detroit's QLine.
- May 22 – Opening of the MBTA Commuter Rail's Boston Landing station on the Framingham/Worcester Line in Massachusetts.

=== June ===
- (California) June 29 – Sonoma–Marin Area Rail Transit begins preview service.

=== August ===
- August 25 – Opening of Sonoma–Marin Area Rail Transit (SMART) commuter system in the North Bay area of San Francisco between northern Santa Rosa and downtown San Rafael, California.

=== December ===
- (California) December 18 - Metrolink Inland Empire–Orange County Line and San Bernardino Line are extended from the San Bernardino Santa Fe Depot to San Bernardino Transit Center to better serve the Inland Empire
