= 2015 in rail transport in the United States =

The following are events related to rail transportation in the United States that happened in 2015.

== January ==
- January 6 – Groundbreaking of the California High-Speed Rail system, indicating sustained construction activity.

== February ==
- (Texas) February 21 - Central Station opens on the Houston METRORail Red Line

== April ==
- (Florida) April 5 – Reopening of Tri-Rail's Miami Intermodal Center in Miami.

== May ==
- (Texas) May 23 - The Purple and Green lines of the Houston Metro Rail system opens with 13 new stops.

== August ==
- (Arizona) August 22 – Phoenix Valley Metro Rail extends from Sycamore/Main Street to Mesa Drive/Main Street via the Central Mesa Extension.

== September ==
- September 12 – Opening of the MAX Orange Line in Portland, Oregon, United States.
- (New York (state)) September 13 – New York City Subway 34th Street–Hudson Yards opens to public, after a series of delays.
