= 2024 in rail transport in the United States =

The following are events related to Rail transportation in the United States that happened in 2024

== Events ==
=== January ===
- (Idaho) (Washington (state)) January 1 – BNSF Railway takes over operations of Montana Rail Link.
- (Florida) January 13 – Tri-Rail introduces direct shuttle service between Metrorail Transfer station and MiamiCentral.
- (Arizona) January 27 – Phoenix Valley Metro Rail extends 3 stations northwest from 19th Avenue/Dunlap to Metro Parkway via Northwest Extension Phase II.

=== April ===
- (Indiana) April 9 - Double Tracking on the South Shore Line is extended from Gary Metro Center to 11th Street station in Michigan City.
- (Washington (state)) April 27 – 2 Line of Link light rail opens 8 stations between South Bellevue and Redmond Technology.

=== May ===
- (Illinois) May 20 – Peterson/Ridge station on the Union Pacific North Line opens.
- (Illinois) (Wisconsin) (Minnesota) May 21 – Amtrak introduces Borealis daily service between Chicago and St. Paul by extending one Hiawatha round-trip.

=== July ===
- (Florida) July 1 – Tri-Rail introduces express service between West Palm Beach and MiamiCentral.

=== August ===
- (Illinois) August 5 – Damen station on the CTA Green Line opens providing more access to the United Center
- (California) August 11 – Caltrain soft launches electrification along the San Francisco Peninsula.
- (Florida) August 12 – SunRail extends 1 stop north from DeBary to DeLand.
- (Virginia) August 22 – Amtrak truncates Northeast Regional service from Newport News to Newport News Transportation Center.
- (Oregon) August 28 – Red Line of MAX Light Rail extends from Beaverton Transit Center to Hillsboro Airport/Fairgrounds.
- (Washington (state)) August 30 – 1 Line of Link light rail extends from Northgate to Lynnwood City Center via the Lynnwood Link extension with 4 new stations.

=== September ===
- (California) September 21 – Caltrain begins full electric service between San Francisco and San Jose.
- (California) September 28 – L Taraval of the Muni Metro resumes service between Wawona and 46th Avenue and Embarcadero.
- (California) September 29 – Copper Line of the San Diego Trolley opens between Santee and El Cajon Transit Center.

=== November ===
- (California) November 3 – Los Angeles Metro Rail: The C Line is rerouted to the new Aviation/Century station, and the southern section of the K Line between Aviation/Century station and Redondo Beach station opens.
- (Illinois) (Indiana) (Ohio) (Pennsylvania) (West Virginia) (Maryland) (Washington, D.C.) (Delaware) (New Jersey) (New York (state)) (Virginia) (North Carolina) (South Carolina) (Georgia (country)) (Florida) November 10 – Amtrak temporarily combines the Capitol Limited and Silver Star trains into the Floridian train between Chicago and Miami.
