= 2026 in rail transport in the United States =

The following are events related to Rail transportation in the United States that happened in 2026.

== Events ==
=== January ===
- (Minnesota) 4 January – The Northstar Line ends service.
- (Maryland) 12 January – American Freedom Train locomotive No. 1 is exhibited at the B&O Railroad Museum after a cosmetic restoration.

=== March ===
- (New Jersey) 16 March – The first track of the Portal North Bridge opens.
- (Washington (state)) 28 March – 2 Line of the Link Light Rail extends to Lynnwood from South Bellevue via 2 new stations.
- 31 March
  - (Washington, D.C.) – DC Streetcar ends service.
  - (Indiana) – Monon Corridor of the South Shore Line opens between Hammond Gateway and Munster/Dyer.

=== April ===
- (Utah) (Colorado) 21 April – The Rockies to the Red Rocks, which was previously Rocky Mountaineer's Denver–Moab route, transitioned to a new operator, Canyon Spirit, under the same parent company, which extended the line to Salt Lake City on the same day.

=== May ===
- (California) 8 May – D Line of Los Angeles Metro Rail extends 3 stops west to Wilshire/La Cienega from Wilshire/Western.
- (Missouri) 18 May – KC Streetcar extends to Berkeley Riverfront from River Market North.

=== September ===
- (California) 28 September – SacRT light rail opens Dos Rios station, an infill station on the Blue Line.
- 30 September
  - (United States) (Canada) – New Airo trains are introduced on Amtrak Cascades between Eugene, Oregon and Vancouver, British Columbia.
  - (Washington (state)) – Pinehurst station opens as an infill station on the Link light rail.

=== October ===
- (California) 15 October – SacRT light rail opens 7th & Railyards station, an infill station on the Green Line.
- (Florida) 30 October – Jacksonville Skyway ends service.

=== November ===
- 16 November – The second track of the Portal North Bridge on the Northeast Corridor in Hudson County, New Jersey opens, enabling the resumption of full train traffic.
- (Pennsylvania) 18 November – A second daily round trip is added on the Amtrak Pennsylvanian.

== Future events ==
=== November ===
- – Amtrak Colorado Mountain Rail opens between Denver and Granby.

=== Unknown date ===
- (United States) – NJ Transit opens the first stage of the Lackawanna Cut-Off Restoration Project, from Lake Hopatcong to Andover .
- (United States) – Saint Louis Metrolink to be extended to MidAmerica Airport from Scott AFB.
- (United States) – SkyLink opens between the terminals of Los Angeles International Airport and its rental car center.
