= Rail transportation in the United States =

Rail transport in the United States
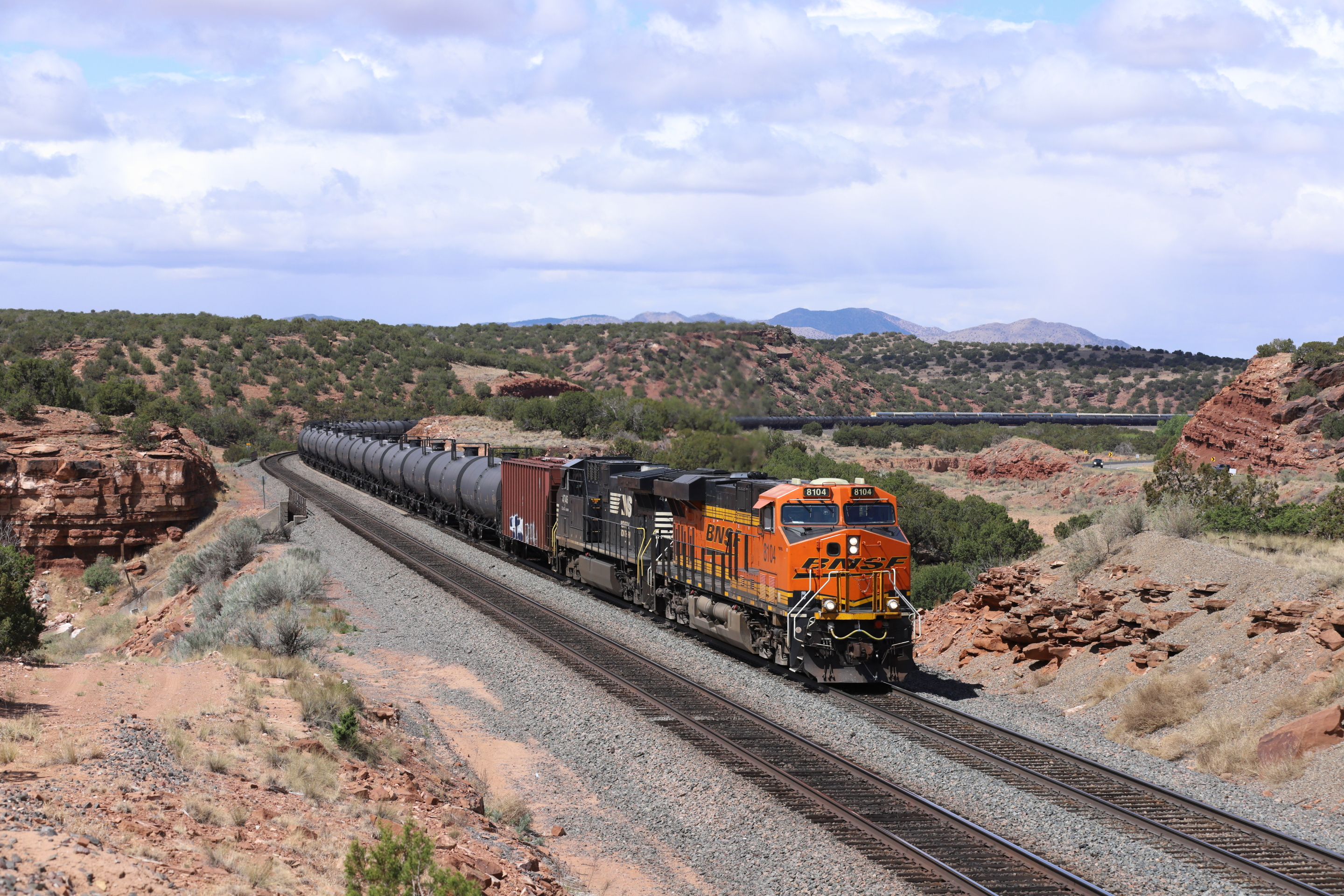
- A BNSF engine leads an empty crude oil train up the grade to Mountainair, New Mexico

Operation
- Major operators: Amtrak; BNSF Railway; Canadian National Railway; CPKC Railway; CSX Transportation; Norfolk Southern Railway; Union Pacific Railroad

Statistics
- Ridership: 549,631,632; 29 million (Amtrak only) (2014)
- Passenger-distance: 10.3 billion (2014)
- Freight: 1.71 trillion ton-mile (2014)

System length
- Total: 136,729 miles (220,044 km)

Track gauge
- Main: 1,435 mm (4 ft 8 1/2 in) standard gauge

Features
- Longest tunnel: Cascade Tunnel, 7.8 miles (12.6 km)
Map
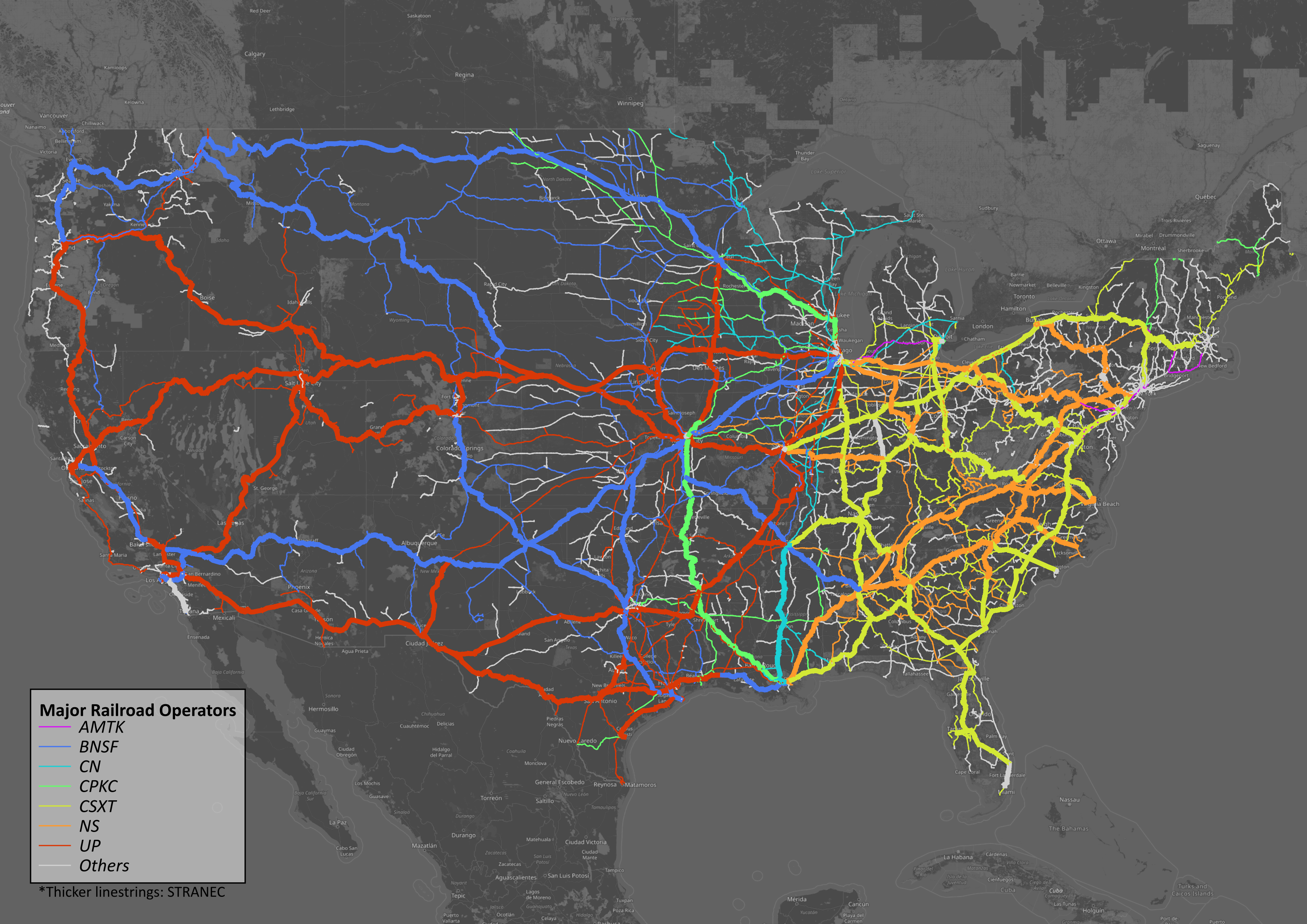
- Major railroad routes, with STRACNET-designated routes shown in thicker lines.

Rail transportation in the United States includes freight and passenger service. Freight moves along a well integrated network of standard gauge private freight railroads that also extend into Canada and Mexico. The United States has the largest rail transport network of any country in the world, about 136,729 miles (220,044 km). (Note: Canada adds 30,709 miles (49,421 km) and Mexico adds 14,533 miles (23,389 km) for a total North American rail network of 181,960 miles (292,840 km)) A larger fraction of freight moves by rail in the United States than in most countries and freight rail companies are generally profitable.

Passenger service includes mass transit in most major American cities. Except for commuter rail, most transit systems are not connected to the national rail network. Federal Railroad Administration regulations require passenger cars used on the national rail network to be heavy and strong enough to protect riders in case of collision with freight trains.

Intercity passenger service is provided nation-wide by Amtrak, with some links to Canada. A few smaller regional providers, including the Alaska Railroad, Brightline and some commuter rail systems link nearby cities. Amtrak offers high-speed Acela service along the East Coast. Intercity rail service was once a large and vital part of the nation's passenger transportation network, but passenger service shrank in the 20th century as commercial air traffic and the Interstate Highway System made commercial air and road transport a practical option throughout the United States. With the exception of the new Brightline system, U.S. passenger service is government subsidized.

== History ==
The nation's earliest railroads were built in the 1820s and 1830s, primarily in New England and the Mid-Atlantic states. The Baltimore and Ohio Railroad, chartered in 1827, was the nation's first common-carrier railroad. By 1850, an extensive railroad network had taken shape in the rapidly industrializing Northeastern United States and the Midwest, while fewer railroads were built in the South, which was more agricultural than other regions. During and after the American Civil War, the first transcontinental railroad was built, to join California with the rest of the national network, at a connection in Iowa.

Railroads expanded throughout the rest of the 19th century, eventually reaching nearly every corner of the nation. The railroads were temporarily nationalized between 1917 and 1920 by the United States Railroad Administration, because of American entry into World War I. Railroad mileage peaked at this time. Railroads were affected deeply by the Great Depression, and some lines were abandoned. A great increase in traffic during World War II brought a reprieve, but after the war railroads faced intense competition from automobiles and aircraft and began a long decline. Passenger service was especially hard hit.

In 1971 the federal government created Amtrak, to take over responsibility for intercity passenger travel. Numerous railroad companies went bankrupt starting in the 1960s, most notably Penn Central Transportation Company in 1971, in the largest bankruptcy in the nation's history at the time. Once again, the federal government intervened, forming Conrail, in 1976, to assume control of bankrupt railroads in the northeast.

In 1980, railroads' fortunes changed after the passage of the Staggers Rail Act, which deregulated railroad companies, who had previously faced much stronger regulation than other modes of transportation. With innovations such as trailer-on-flatcar and intermodal freight transport, railroad traffic increased. After the Staggers Act, many railroads merged, forming major systems, such as CSX and Norfolk Southern, in the Eastern United States, and BNSF Railway, in the Western United States; Union Pacific Railroad also purchased some competitors. Another result of the Staggers Act was the rise of shortline railroads, which formed to operate lines that major railroads had abandoned or sold off. Hundreds of these companies were formed by the end of the century. Freight railroads invested in modernization and greater capacity as they entered the 21st century, and intermodal transport continued to grow, while traditional traffic, such as coal, fell.

=== 19th century ===
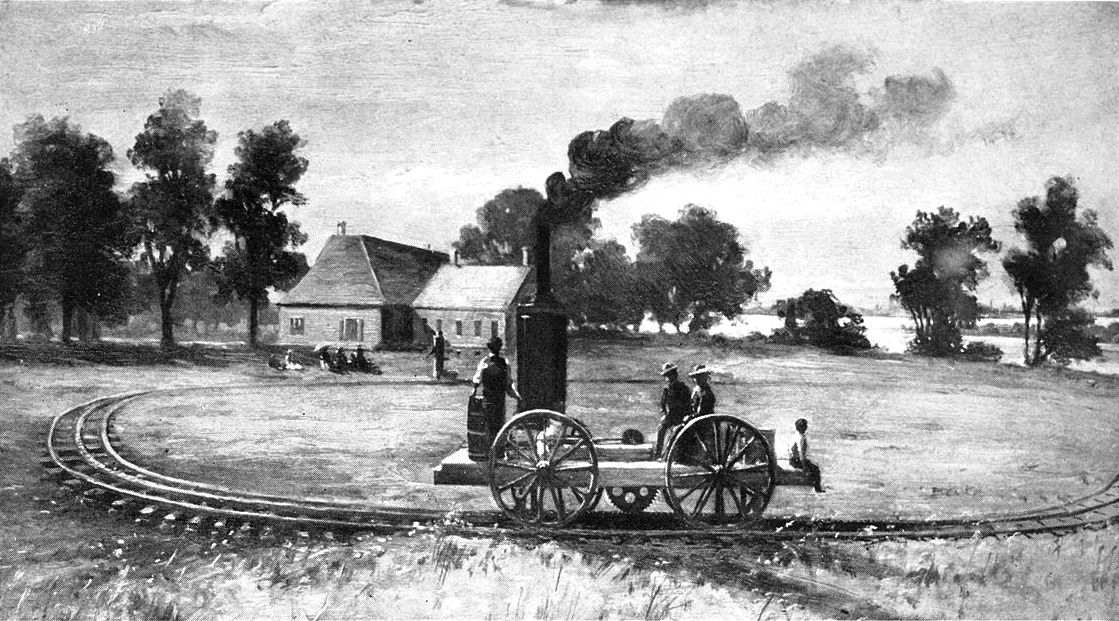
The first American locomotive at Castle Point in Hoboken, New Jersey, c. 1826

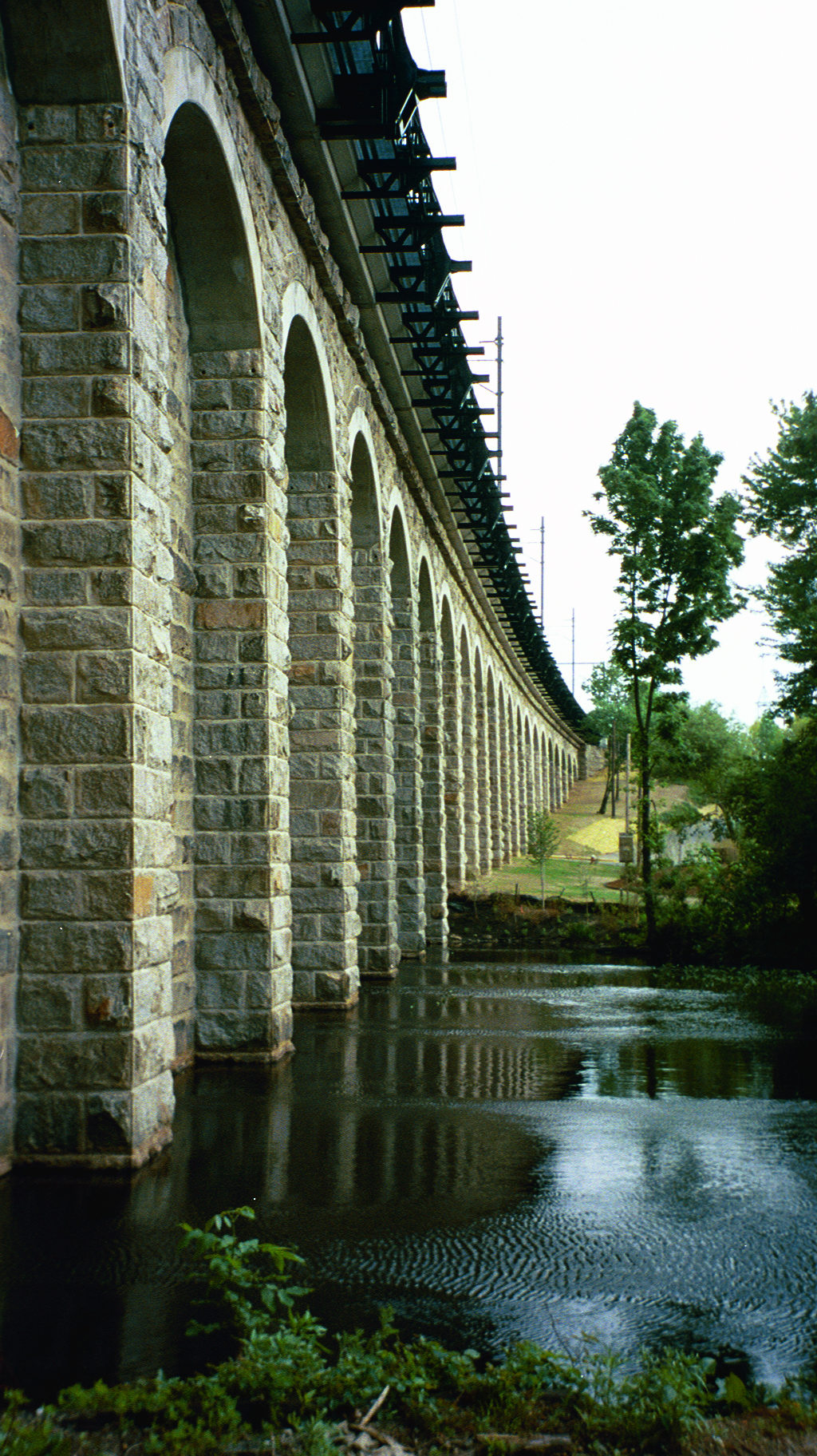
The Canton Viaduct, built in 1834, is still in use today on the Northeast Corridor.

Between 1762 and 1764 a gravity railroad (mechanized tramway) (Montresor's Tramway) was built by British Army engineers up the steep riverside terrain near the Niagara River waterfall's escarpment at the Niagara Portage in Lewiston, New York.

Between the 1820s and 1840s, Americans closely watched the development of railways in Great Britain. There, the main competition came from canals, many of which operated under state ownership and from privately owned steamboats plying the nation's vast river system. In 1829, Massachusetts prepared an elaborate rail plan. Government support, most especially the detailing of officers from the U.S. Army Corps of Engineers – the nation's only source of civil engineering expertise – was crucial in assisting private enterprise in building nearly all the country's railroads.

Army Engineer officers surveyed and selected routes, planned, designed, and constructed rights-of-way, track, and structures, and introduced the Army's system of reports and accountability to the railroad companies. More than one in ten of the then 1,058 graduates from the U.S. Military Academy at West Point between 1802 and 1866 became corporate presidents, chief engineers, treasurers, superintendents and general managers of railroad companies. Among the Army officers who thus assisted the building and managing of the first American railroads were Stephen Harriman Long, George Washington Whistler, and Herman Haupt.

State governments granted charters that created the business corporation and gave a limited right of eminent domain, allowing the railroad to buy needed land, even over the owner's objections. (Note: Horse-drawn rail lines were in use for short-distance hauling of stone. See Gridley Bryant. Other purpose-built railroads were operating in the 1820s. The Delaware and Hudson Canal Company, which later became the Delaware & Hudson Railroad, built its first tracks in 1826 as a gravity railroad in Carbondale, Pennsylvania, to haul coal from a mine to the canal at Honesdale.)

In 1827, the Baltimore and Ohio Railroad (B&O) was chartered to build a steam railroad west from Baltimore, Maryland, to a point on the Ohio River and began scheduled freight service over its first section on May 24, 1830. The first railroad to carry passengers, and, by accident, the first tourist railroad, began operating in 1827. Named the Lehigh Coal & Navigation Company, initially a gravity road feeding anthracite coal downhill to the Lehigh Canal, using mule-power to return nine miles up the mountain; but, by the summer of 1829, as newspapers documented, it regularly carried passengers. In 1843, renamed the Summit Hill & Mauch Chunk Railroad, it added a steam powered cable-return track for true two-way operation and ran as a common carrier and tourist road from the 1890s to 1937. Lasting 111 years, the SH&MC is described by some to be the world's first roller coaster. (Note: The SH&MCsbRR carried sundries, groceries, and goods up to Summit Hill, including official postal deliveries.)

The first purpose-built common carrier railroad in the northeast was the Mohawk & Hudson Railroad; incorporated in 1826. It began operating in August 1831. Soon, a second passenger line, the Saratoga & Schenectady Railroad, started service in June 1832.

In 1835, the B&O completed a branch from Baltimore southward to Washington, D.C. The Boston & Providence Railroad was incorporated in 1831 to build a railroad between Boston and Providence, Rhode Island; the road was completed in 1835 with the completion of the Canton Viaduct in Canton, Massachusetts.

Numerous short lines were built, especially in the south, to provide connections to the river systems and the river boats common to the era. In Louisiana, the Pontchartrain Rail-Road, a 5-mile (8.0 km) route connecting the Mississippi River with Lake Pontchartrain at New Orleans was completed in 1831 and provided over a century of operation. Completed in 1830, the Tuscumbia, Courtland & Decatur Railroad became the first railroad constructed west of the Appalachian Mountains; it connected the Alabama cities of Decatur and Tuscumbia.

Soon, other roads that would themselves be purchased or merged into larger entities, were formed. The Camden & Amboy Railroad (C&A), the first railroad built in New Jersey, completed its route between its namesake cities in 1834. The C&A ran successfully for decades connecting New York City to the Philadelphia metropolitan area, and would eventually become part of the Pennsylvania Railroad.

By 1850, over 9,000 miles (14,000 km) of railroad lines had been built. The B&O's westward route reached the Ohio River in 1852, the first eastern seaboard railroad to do so. Railroad companies in the North and Midwest constructed networks that linked nearly every major city by 1860. In the 1850s the Congress decided to promote railroads by giving them land grants. The Illinois Central Railroad was the first to be established. Banks loaned it the $27 million needed for construction and by 1860 it operated 705 miles of track criss-crossing Illinois from Chicago to Galena to Cairo. It was the longest railway in the world. It set up a depot every ten miles, where ambitious men rushed in to start a town by buying plots from the land grant.

In the 1850s, the national railway grid expanded rapidly from 8,400 miles of track to 25,000. Outside the Midwest, rail mileage doubled. In the Midwest it expanded by a factor of 7, from 1,300 to 9,000 miles. Chicago became the nation's greatest rail center. Much of the necessary iron and steel was imported from Pittsburgh, but new mills were increasingly set up in Chicago. When the war broke out in 1861, Chicago's main rivals Cincinnati and St Louis lost access to their primary markets to the South. Chicago replaced them as the hub for the national distribution of wheat and meat. Chicago became the supply base for the Western armies, as General Ulysses S Grant took the Illinois Central down to Cairo, and then marched south to seize control of Kentucky and Tennessee on his way to Memphis, Chattanooga, and Atlanta.

==== Transcontinental railroad ====
With the rapid growth and wealth of Gold Rush California in the 1850, a transcontinental railroad became an urgent necessity. There were two problems: Should there be a northern route or a southern route, and how to pay for it. When the Confederate states left the Union during the Civil War, the first question was solved. The success of the Illinois Central indicated that land grants would be the main financial device...

The celebration at the meeting of the railroad in Promontory Summit, Utah in May 1869

The First Transcontinental Railroad in the U.S. was built in the 1860s, linking the railroad network of the eastern U.S. with California on the Pacific coast. Completed on May 10, 1869, at the Golden spike event at Promontory Summit, Utah, it created a nationwide mechanized transportation network that revolutionized the population and economy of the American West, catalyzing the transition from the wagon trains of previous decades to a modern transportation system. It was the first transcontinental railroad by connecting myriad eastern railroads to the Pacific Ocean.

Authorized by the Pacific Railway Act of 1862 and heavily backed by the federal government, the first transcontinental railroad was the culmination of a decades-long movement to build such a line and was one of the crowning achievements of the presidency of Abraham Lincoln, completed five years after his death. The building of the railroad required enormous feats of engineering and labor in the crossing of the Great Plains and the Rocky Mountains by the westbound Union Pacific Railroad (UP) and eastbound Central Pacific Railroad, the two federally chartered enterprises that built the line.

It enabled the accelerated populating of the West by homesteaders, leading to rapid cultivation of new farm lands. The Central Pacific and the Southern Pacific Railroad combined operations in 1870 and formally merged in 1885; the Union Pacific originally bought the Southern Pacific in 1901 and was forced to divest it in 1913, but took it over again in 1996. Much of the original roadbed is still in use today and owned by UP, which is descended from both of the original railroads.

==== Regulation ====
Large railroad companies, including the New York Central, Grand Trunk Railway, and the Southern Pacific, spanned several states. In response to monopolistic practices, such as price fixing and other excesses of some railroads and their owners, Congress created the Interstate Commerce Commission (ICC) in 1887. The ICC indirectly controlled the business activities of the railroads through issuance of extensive regulations. Congress also enacted antitrust legislation to prevent railroad monopolies, beginning with the Sherman Antitrust Act in 1890. Financiers such as Cornelius Vanderbilt and Jay Gould became wealthy through railroad ownerships.

==== Rail gauge selection ====
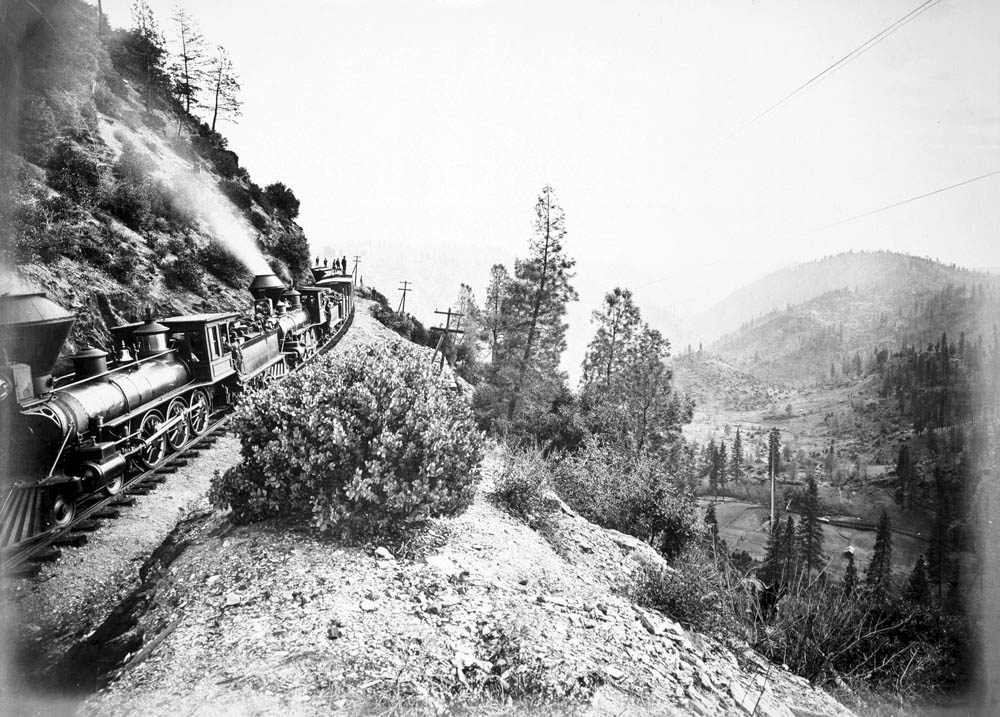
Central Pacific Railroad at Cape Horn, California, c. 1880

Many Canadian and U.S. railroads originally used various broad gauges, but most were converted to 4 ft 8 1/2 in (1,435 mm) by 1886, when the conversion of much of the southern rail network from 5 ft (1,524 mm) gauge took place. This and the standardization of couplings and air brakes enabled the pooling and interchange of locomotives and rolling stock.

==== Impact of railroads on the economy ====
Railroad mileage increase by groups of states Source: Chauncey Depew (ed.), One Hundred Years of American Commerce 1795–1895 p 111
Region	1850	1860	1870	1880	1890
New England	2,507	3,660	4,494	5,982	6,831
Middle States	3,202	6,705	10,964	15,872	21,536
Southern States	2,036	8,838	11,192	14,778	29,209
Western States and Territories	1,276	11,400	24,587	52,589	62,394
Pacific States and Territories		23	1,677	4,080	9,804
Totals	9,021	30,626	52,914	93,301	129,774

The railroad had its largest impact on the American transportation system during the second half of the 19th century. The standard historical interpretation holds that the railroads were central to the development of a national market in the United States and served as a model of how to organize, finance and manage a large corporation, along with allowing growth of the American population outside of the eastern regions.

=== 20th century ===
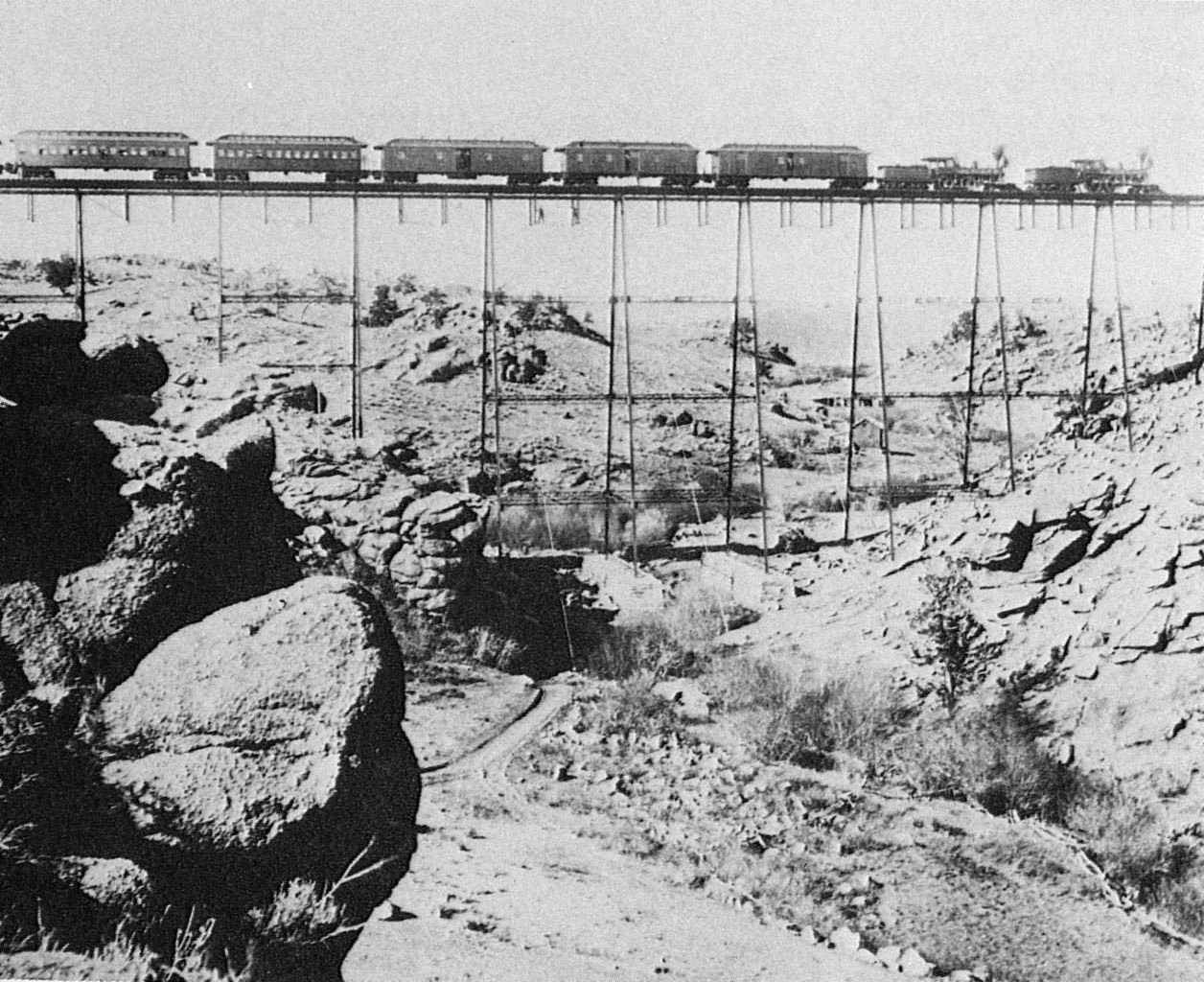
Train running on the Dale Creek Iron Viaduct in Wyoming, c. 1860

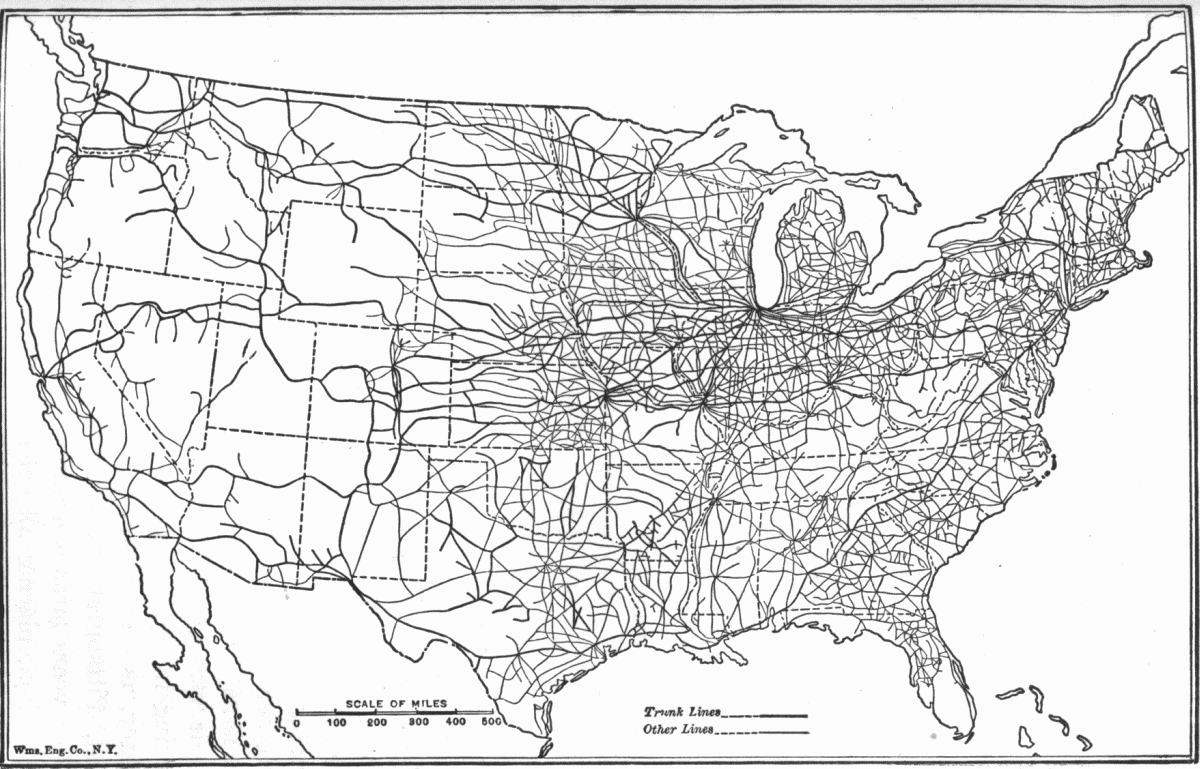
Railroads of the United States in 1918

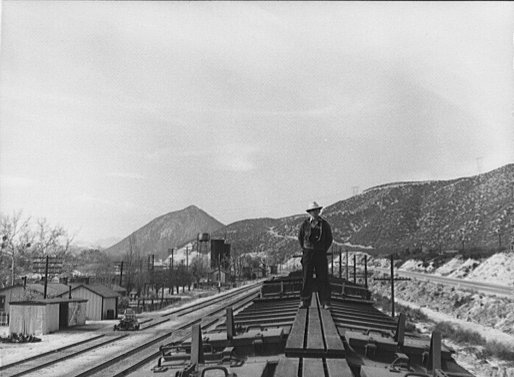
An Atchison, Topeka and Santa Fe Railway freight train pauses at Cajon, California, in March 1943 to cool its braking equipment after descending Cajon Pass; the U.S. Route 66 is visible to the right of the train.

An Amtrak train in New York.

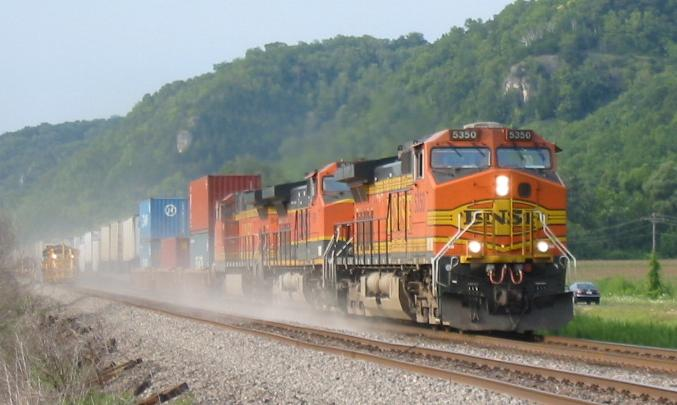
BNSF Railway's double stack freight train in Wisconsin

The principal mainline railroads concentrated their efforts on moving freight and passengers over long distances. But many had suburban services near large cities, which might also be served by Streetcar and Interurban lines. The Interurban was a concept which relied almost exclusively on passenger traffic for revenue. Unable to survive the Great Depression, the failure of most Interurbans by that time left many cities without suburban passenger railroads, although the largest cities such as New York City, Chicago, Boston and Philadelphia continued to have suburban service. The major railroads passenger flagship services included multi-day journeys on luxury trains resembling hotels, which were unable to compete with airlines in the 1950s. Rural communities were served by slow trains no more than twice a day. They survived until the 1960s because the same train hauled the Railway Post Office cars, paid for by the US Post Office. RPOs were withdrawn when mail sorting was mechanized.

As early as the 1930s, automobile travel had begun to cut into the rail passenger market, somewhat reducing economies of scale, but it was the development of the Interstate Highway System and of commercial aviation in the 1950s and 1960s, as well as increasingly restrictive regulation, that dealt the most damaging blows to rail transportation, both passenger and freight. General Motors and others were convicted of running the streetcar industry into the ground purposefully in what is referred to as the Great American Streetcar Scandal. There was little point in operating passenger trains to advertise freight service when those who made decisions about freight shipping traveled by car and by air, and when the railroads' chief competitors for that market were interstate trucking companies.

Soon, the only things keeping most passenger trains running were legal obligations. Meanwhile, companies who were interested in using railroads for profitable freight traffic were looking for ways to get out of those legal obligations, and it looked like intercity passenger rail service would soon become extinct in the United States beyond a few highly populated corridors. The final blow for passenger trains in the U.S. came with the loss of railroad post offices in the 1960s. On May 1, 1971, with only a few exceptions, the federally-funded Amtrak took over all intercity passenger rail service in the continental United States. The Rio Grande, with its Denver-Ogden Rio Grande Zephyr and the Southern with its Washington, D.C.–New Orleans Southern Crescent chose to stay out of Amtrak, and the Rock Island, with two intrastate Illinois trains, was too far gone to be included into Amtrak.

Freight transportation continued to labor under regulations developed when rail transport had a monopoly on intercity traffic, and railroads only competed with one another. An entire generation of rail managers had been trained to operate under this regulatory regime. Labor unions and their work rules were likewise a formidable barrier to change. Overregulation, management and unions formed an "iron triangle" of stagnation, frustrating the efforts of leaders such as the New York Central's Alfred E. Perlman. In particular, the dense rail network in the Northeastern U.S. was in need of radical pruning and consolidation. A spectacularly unsuccessful beginning was the 1968 formation and subsequent bankruptcy of the Penn Central, barely two years later.

On routes where a single railroad has had an undisputed monopoly, passenger service was as spartan and as expensive as the market and ICC regulation would bear, since such railroads had no need to advertise their freight services. However, on routes where two or three railroads were in direct competition with each other for freight business, such railroads would spare no expense to make their passenger trains as fast, luxurious, and affordable as possible, as it was considered to be the most effective way of advertising their profitable freight services.

The National Association of Railroad Passengers (NARP) was formed in 1967 to lobby for the continuation of passenger trains. Its lobbying efforts were hampered somewhat by Democratic opposition to any sort of rail subsidies to the privately owned railroads, and Republican opposition to nationalization of the railroad industry. The proponents were aided by the fact that few in the federal government wanted to be held responsible for the seemingly inevitable extinction of the passenger train, which most regarded as tantamount to political suicide. The urgent need to solve the passenger train disaster was heightened by the bankruptcy filing of the Penn Central, the dominant railroad in the Northeastern United States, on June 21, 1970.

Under the Rail Passenger Service Act of 1970, Congress created the National Railroad Passenger Corporation (NRPC) to subsidize and oversee the operation of intercity passenger trains. The Act provided that:

- Any railroad operating intercity passenger service could contract with the NRPC, thereby joining the national system.
- Participating railroads bought into the new corporation using a formula based on their recent intercity passenger losses. The purchase price could be satisfied either by cash or rolling stock; in exchange, the railroads received Amtrak common stock.
- Any participating railroad was freed of the obligation to operate intercity passenger service after May 1971, except for those services chosen by the U.S. Department of Transportation as part of a "basic system" of service and paid for by NRPC using its federal funds.
- Railroads who chose not to join the Amtrak system were required to continue operating their existing passenger service until 1975 and thenceforth had to pursue the customary ICC approval process for any discontinuance or alteration to the service.

The original working brand name for NRPC was Railpax, which eventually became Amtrak. At the time, many Washington insiders viewed the corporation as a face-saving way to give passenger trains the one "last hurrah" demanded by the public, but expected that the NRPC would quietly disappear in a few years as public interest waned. However, while Amtrak's political and financial support have often been shaky, popular and political support for Amtrak has allowed it to survive into the 21st century.

To preserve a declining freight rail industry, Congress passed the Regional Rail Reorganization Act of 1973, sometimes called the "3R Act". The act was an attempt to salvage viable freight operations from the bankrupt Penn Central and other lines in the northeast, mid-Atlantic and Midwestern regions. The law created the Consolidated Rail Corporation (Conrail), a government-owned corporation, which began operations in 1976. Another law, the Railroad Revitalization and Regulatory Reform Act of 1976 (the "4R Act"), provided more specifics for the Conrail acquisitions and set the stage for more comprehensive deregulation of the railroad industry. Portions of the Penn Central, Erie Lackawanna, Reading Railroad, Ann Arbor Railroad, Central Railroad of New Jersey, Lehigh Valley, and Lehigh and Hudson River were merged into Conrail. On December 31, 1996, the Atchison, Topeka and Santa Fe Railway merged with the Burlington Northern Railroad, creating the Burlington Northern Santa Fe Railway.

The freight industry continued its decline until Congress passed the Staggers Rail Act in 1980, which largely deregulated the rail industry. Since then, U.S. freight railroads have reorganized, discontinued their lightly used routes and returned to profitability.

== Freight railroads ==
Freight Transport volumes (Tonne-Kilometers)

Freight railroads play an important role in the U.S. economy, especially for moving imports and exports using containers, and for shipments of coal and oil. Productivity rose 172% between 1981 and 2000, while rates decreased by 55%, after accounting for inflation. Rail's share of the American freight market rose to 43%.

U.S. railroads still play a major role in the nation's freight shipping. They carried 750 billion ton-miles by 1975 which doubled to 1.5 trillion ton-miles in 2005. In the 1950s, the U.S. and Europe moved roughly the same percentage of freight by rail; by 2000, the share of U.S. rail freight was 38% while in Europe only 8% of freight traveled by rail; a large proportion of this difference is due to external factors such as geography and higher use of goods like coal.

In ton-miles, railroads annually move more than 25% of the United States' freight and connect businesses with each other across the country and with markets overseas. In 2018, US rail freight had a transport energy efficiency of 473 ton-miles per gallon of fuel. In recent years, railroads have gradually been losing intermodal traffic to trucking.

=== Railroad classes ===
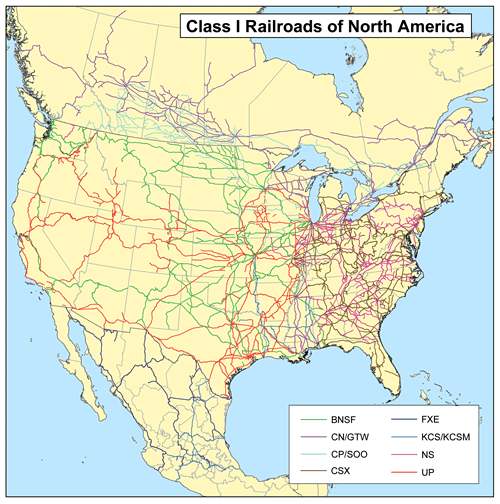
2006 map of North American Class I railroads

U.S. freight railroads are separated into three classes, set by the Surface Transportation Board, based on annual revenues:

- Class I for freight railroads with annual operating revenues above $346.8 million in 2006 dollars. In 1900, there were 132 Class I railroads. In 2024, as the result of mergers, bankruptcies, and major changes in the regulatory definition of "Class I", there are only six railroads operating in the United States that meet the criteria for Class I. As of 2011, U.S. freight railroads operated 139,679 route-miles (224,792 km) of standard gauge in the U.S. Although Amtrak qualifies for Class I status under the revenue criterion, it is not considered a Class I railroad because it is not a freight railroad.
- Class II for freight railroads with revenues between $27.8 million and $346.7 million in 2000 dollars
- Class III for all other freight revenues.

In 2013, the U.S. moved more oil out of North Dakota by rail than by the Trans-Alaska pipeline. This trend—tenfold in two years and 40-fold in five years—is forecast to increase.

=== Classes of freight railroads ===
There are four different classes of freight railroads: Class I, regional, local line haul, and switching & terminal. Class I railroads are defined as those with revenue of at least $346.8 million in 2006. They comprise just 1% of the number of freight railroads, but account for 67% of the industry's mileage, 90% of its employees, and 93% of its freight revenue.

A regional railroad is a line haul railroad with at least 350 miles (560 km) and/or revenue between $40 million and the Class I threshold. There were 33 regional railroads in 2006. Most have between 75 and 500 employees.

Local line haul railroads operate less than 350 miles (560 km) and earn less than $40 million per year (most earn less than $5 million per year). In 2006, there were 323 local line haul railroads. They generally perform point-to-point service over short distances.

Switching and terminal (S&T) carriers are railroads that primarily provide switching and/or terminal services, regardless of revenue. They perform pick up and delivery services within a certain area.

=== Traffic and public benefits ===
Freight in the United States by percent ton-miles (2010 FRA report)

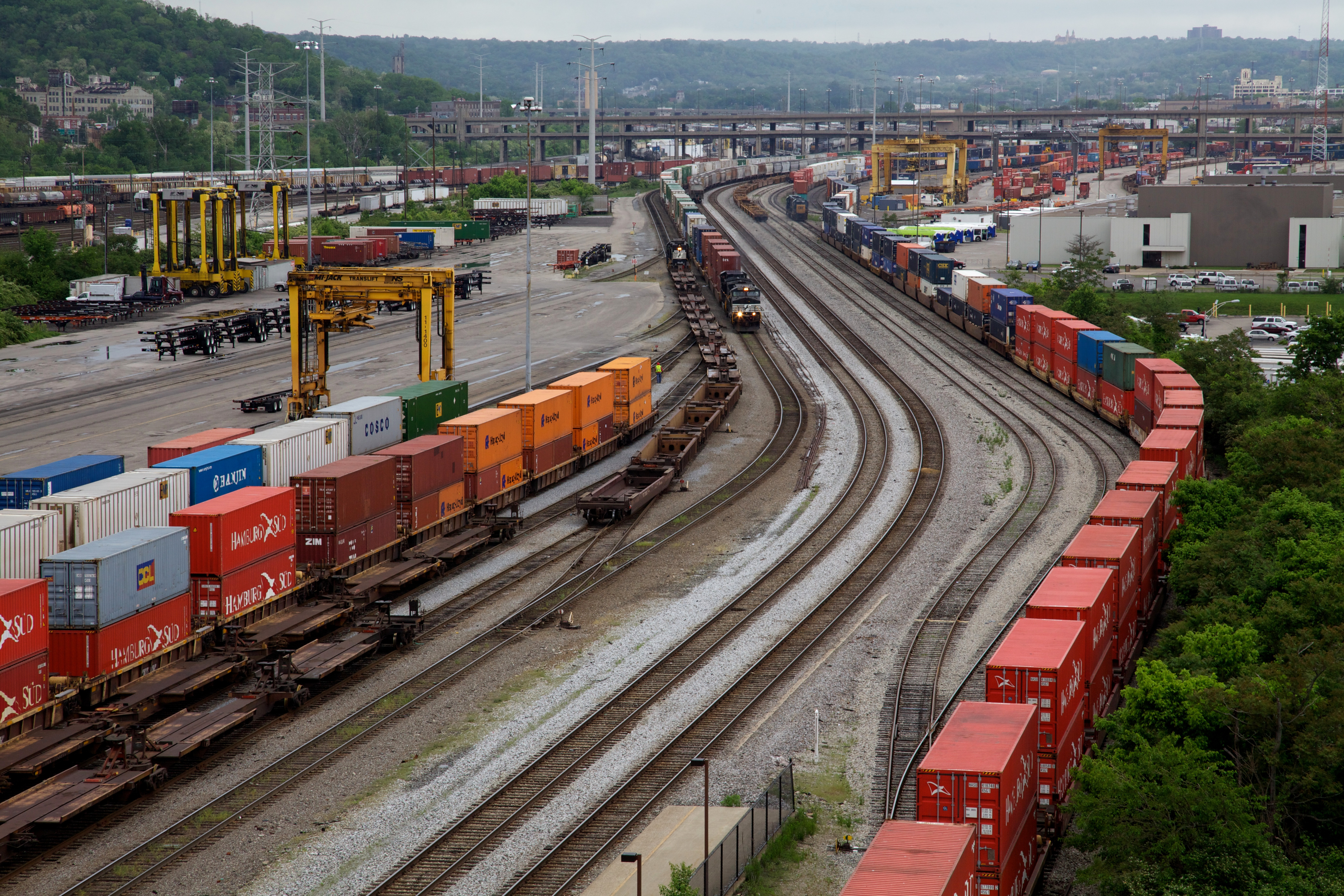
Double-stack yard operations in Cincinnati

U.S. freight railroads operate in a highly competitive marketplace. According to a 2010 FRA report, within the U.S., railroads carried 39.5% of freight by ton-mile, followed by trucks (28.6%), oil pipelines (19.6%), barges (12%) and air (0.3%). However, railroads' revenue share has been slowly falling for decades, a reflection of the intensity of the competition they face and of the large rate reductions railroads have passed through to their customers over the years.

In 2011, North American railroads operated 1,471,736 freight cars and 31,875 locomotives, with 215,985 employees. They originated 39.53 million carloads (averaging 63 tons each) and generated $81.7 billion in freight revenue of present 2014. The average haul was 917 miles. The largest (Class 1) U.S. railroads carried 10.17 million intermodal containers and 1.72 million piggyback trailers. Intermodal traffic was 6.2% of tonnage originated and 12.6% of revenue. The largest commodities were coal, chemicals, farm products, nonmetallic minerals and intermodal. Other major commodities carried include lumber, automobiles, and waste materials. Coal alone was 43.3% of tonnage and 24.7% of revenue. Coal accounted for roughly half of U.S. electricity generation and was a major export. As natural gas became cheaper than coal, coal supplies dropped 11% in 2015 but coal rail freight dropped by up to 40%, allowing an increase in car transport by rail, some in tri-level railcars. US coal consumption dwindled from over 1,100 million tons in 2008 to 687 million tons in 2018.

=== Freight rail working with passenger rail ===
Prior to Amtrak's creation in 1970, intercity passenger rail service in the U.S. was provided by the same companies that provided freight service. When Amtrak was formed, in return for government permission to exit the passenger rail business, freight railroads donated passenger equipment to Amtrak and helped it get started with a capital infusion of some $200 million.

The vast majority of the 22,000 mi (35,000 km) or so over which Amtrak operates are actually owned by freight railroads. By law, freight railroads must grant Amtrak access to their track upon request. In return, Amtrak pays fees to freight railroads to cover the incremental costs of Amtrak's use of freight railroad tracks.

== Passenger railroads ==
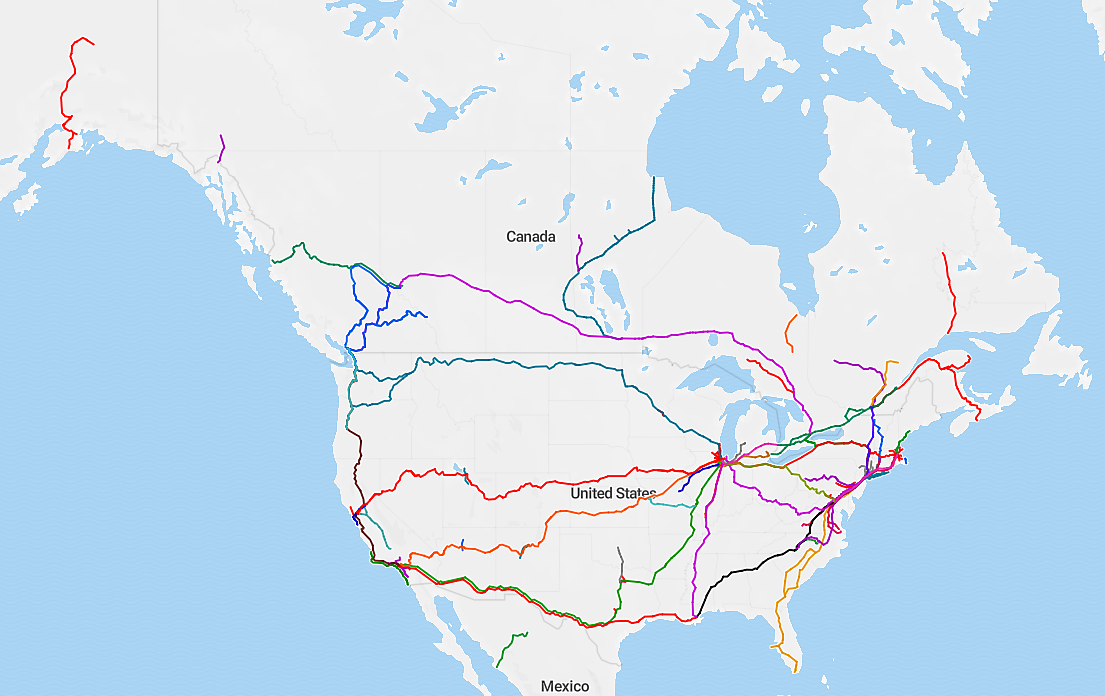
Passenger trains in North America (not shown: Brightline in Florida)

The sole long-distance intercity passenger railroad in the continental U.S. is Amtrak, and multiple current commuter rail systems provide regional intercity services such as New York-New Haven, and Stockton-San Jose. In Alaska, intercity service is provided by Alaska Railroad instead of Amtrak. Commuter rail systems exist in more than a dozen metropolitan areas, but these systems are not extensively interconnected, so commuter rail cannot be used alone to traverse the country. Commuter systems have been proposed in approximately two dozen other cities, but interplays between various local-government administrative bottlenecks and ripple effects from the Great Recession have generally pushed such projects farther and farther into the future, or have even sometimes canceled them entirely.

The most culturally notable and physically evident exception to the general lack of significant passenger rail transport in the U.S. is the Northeast Corridor between Washington, Baltimore, Philadelphia, New York City, and Boston, with significant branches in Connecticut and Massachusetts. The corridor handles frequent passenger service that is both Amtrak and commuter. New York City itself is noteworthy for high usage of passenger rail transport, both subway and commuter rail (Long Island Rail Road, Metro-North Railroad, New Jersey Transit). The subway system is used by one third of all U.S. mass transit users. Chicago also sees high rail ridership, with a local elevated system, one of the world's last interurban lines, and fourth most-ridden commuter rail system in the United States: Metra. Other major cities with substantial rail infrastructure include Philadelphia's SEPTA, Boston's MBTA, and Washington, D.C.'s network of commuter rail and rapid transit. Denver, Colorado constructed a new electrified commuter rail system in the 2000s to complement the city's light rail system. The commuter rail systems of San Diego and Los Angeles, Coaster and Metrolink, connect in Oceanside, California. The San Francisco Bay Area additionally hosts several local passenger rail operators, the largest of which are Caltrain, the Altamont Corridor Express, Sonoma–Marin Area Rail Transit, and Bay Area Rapid Transit.

Privately run inter-city passenger rail operations have also been restarted since 2018 in South Florida, with additional routes under development. Brightline began rail service in January 2018 between Fort Lauderdale and West Palm Beach; its service was extended to Miami in May 2018, and an extension to Orlando International Airport opened for daily service on September 22, 2023, which includes a segment of brand new rail line from Orlando eastward toward the Atlantic coast. Brightline has also proposed a further extension of its service from Orlando to Tampa via Walt Disney World, and a high-speed rail service from Los Angeles to Las Vegas. In addition, the Texas Central Railway is currently developing plans for a proposed greenfield high-speed rail line using Japanese Shinkansen trains between Dallas and Houston. Construction was expected to begin in 2020 for a 2026 opening, but a major lawsuit delayed the project and as of February 2023 there are no signs of construction activity.

A proposal is in the works for a over 200 mph high-speed rail system from Dallas/Fort Worth to Atlanta, Georgia along the I-20 corridor, currently named the I-20X, that will pass directly through places like Kilgore, Texas a historic railway city, bringing passenger rail service to that corridor for the first time since the Texas and Pacific's unnamed successor to the Louisiana Eagle in the late 1960s. This initiative promises to support regional development, reduce car dependency, and create jobs in areas like Kilgore, Tyler and East Texas. Early phases of planning are in motion, with design on the Atlanta-Birmingham segment expected to start by 2025.

=== Car types ===
The basic design of a passenger car was standardized by 1870. By 1900, the main car types were: baggage, coach, combine, diner, dome car, lounge, observation, private, Pullman, railroad post office (RPO) and sleeper.

==== 19th century: First passenger cars and early development ====
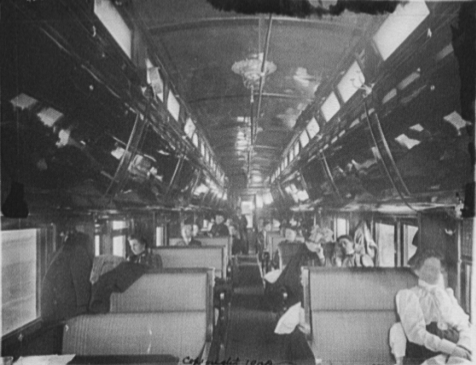
The interior of a Pullman car on the Chicago and Alton Railroad, circa 1900

The first passenger cars resembled stagecoaches. They were short, often less than 10 ft (3.05 m) long, tall and rode on a single pair of axles.

American mail cars first appeared in the 1860s and at first followed English design. They had a hook that would catch the mailbag in its crook.

As locomotive technology progressed in the mid-19th century, trains grew in length and weight. Passenger cars grew along with them, first getting longer with the addition of a second truck (one at each end), and wider as their suspensions improved. Cars built for European use featured side door compartments, while American car design favored a single pair of doors at one end of the car in the car's vestibule; compartmentized cars on American railroads featured a long hallway with doors from the hall to the compartments.

One possible reason for this difference in design principles between American and European carbuilding practice could be the average distance between stations on the two continents. While most European railroads connected towns and villages that were still very closely spaced, American railroads had to travel over much greater distances to reach their destinations. Building passenger cars with a long passageway through the length of the car allowed the passengers easy access to the restroom, among other things, on longer journeys.

Dining cars first appeared in the late 1870s and into the 1880s. Until this time, the common practice was to stop for meals at restaurants along the way (which led to the rise of Fred Harvey's chain of Harvey House restaurants in America). At first, the dining car was simply a place to serve meals that were picked up en route, but they soon evolved to include galleys in which the meals were prepared.

==== 1900–1950: Lighter materials, new car types ====
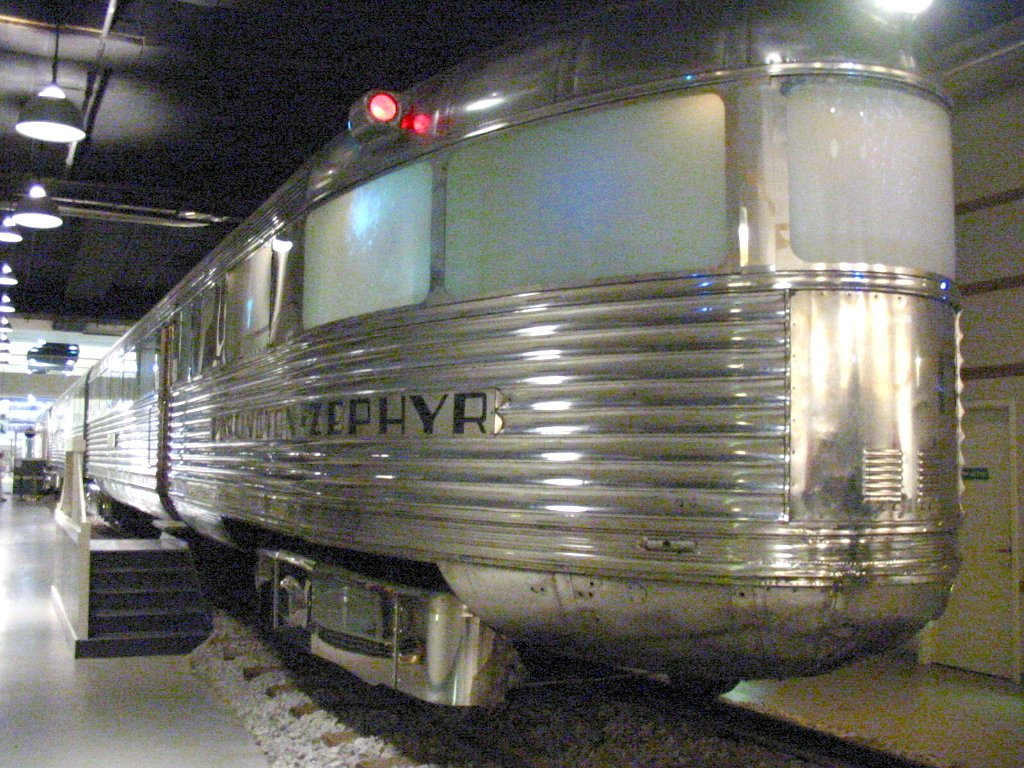
The observation car on CB&Q's Pioneer Zephyr. The carbody was made of stainless steel in 1934, it is seen here at the Museum of Science and Industry in Chicago in 2003.

By the 1920s, passenger cars on the larger standard gauge railroads were normally between 60 and 70 feet (18 and 21 m) long. The cars of this time were still quite ornate, many of them being built by experienced coach makers and skilled carpenters.

With the 1930s came the widespread use of stainless steel for car bodies. The typical passenger car was now much lighter than its "heavyweight" wood cousins of old. The new "lightweight" and streamlined cars carried passengers in speed and comfort to an extent that had not been experienced to date. Aluminum and Cor-ten were also used in lightweight car construction, but stainless steel was the preferred material for car bodies. It is not the lightest of materials, nor is it the least expensive, but stainless steel cars could be, and often were, left unpainted except for the car's reporting marks that were required by law.

By the end of the 1930s, railroads and car builders were debuting car body and interior styles that could only be dreamed of before. In 1937, the Pullman Company delivered the first cars equipped with roomettes—that is, the car's interior was sectioned off into compartments, much like the coaches that were still in widespread use across Europe. Pullman's roomettes, however, were designed with the single traveler in mind. The roomette featured a large picture window, a privacy door, a single fold-away bed, a sink and small toilet. The roomette's floor space was barely larger than the space taken up by the bed, but it allowed the traveler to ride in luxury compared to the multilevel semiprivate berths of old.

Now that passenger cars were lighter, they were able to carry heavier loads, but the size of the average passenger load that rode in them didn't increase to match the cars' new capacities. The average passenger car couldn't get any wider or longer due to side clearances along the railroad lines, but they generally could get taller because they were still shorter than many freight cars and locomotives. As a result, the railroads soon began building and buying dome and bilevel cars to carry more passengers.

=== 1950–present: High-technology advancements ===
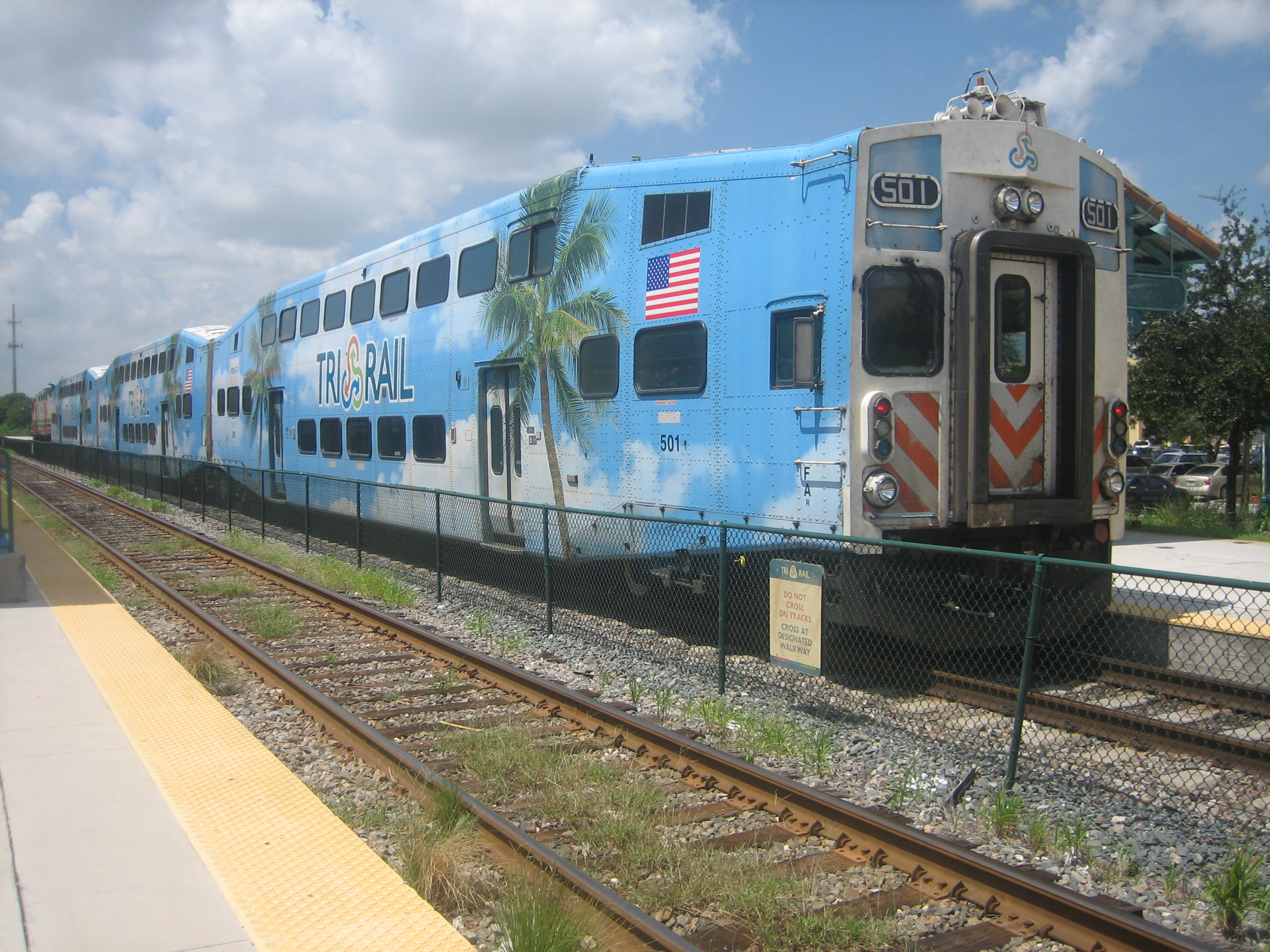
A Bombardier BiLevel Coach. Shown here is a Tri-Rail coach, a regional commuter rail system in Florida. Similar cars are used in California by Metrolink.

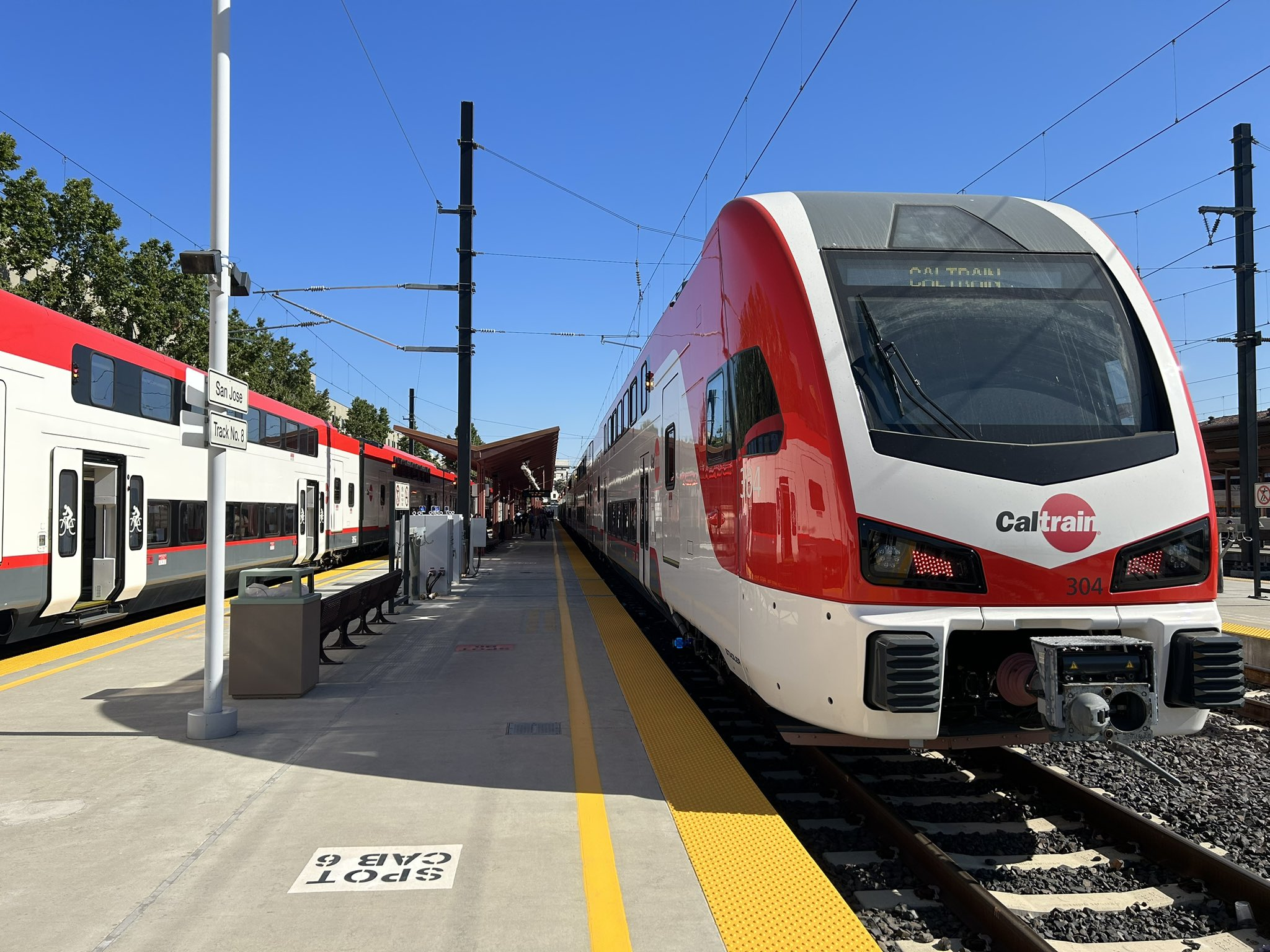
Stadler KISS double-decker EMUs of Caltrain at San Jose Diridon

Carbody styles have generally remained consistent since the middle of the 20th century. While new car types have not made much of an impact, the existing car types have been further enhanced with new technology.

Starting in the 1950s, the passenger travel market declined in North America, though there was growth in commuter rail. The higher clearances in North America enabled bi-level commuter coaches that could hold more passengers. These cars started to become common in the United States in the 1960s.

While intercity passenger rail travel declined in the United States during the 1950s, ridership continued to increase in Europe during that time. With the increase came newer technology on existing and new equipment. The Spanish company Talgo began experimenting in the 1940s with technology that would enable the axles to steer into a curve, allowing the train to move around the curve at a higher speed. The steering axles evolved into mechanisms that would also tilt the passenger car as it entered a curve to counter the centrifugal force experienced by the train, further increasing speeds on existing track. Today, tilting passenger trains are commonplace. Talgo's trains are used on some short and medium distance routes such as Amtrak Cascades from Eugene, Oregon, to Vancouver, British Columbia.

In August 2016, the Department of Transportation approved the largest loan in the department's history, $2.45 billion to upgrade the passenger train service in the Northeast region. The $2.45 billion will be used to purchase 28 new train sets for the high-speed Acela train between Washington through Philadelphia, New York and into Boston. The money will also be used build new stations and platforms. The money will also be used to rehabilitate railroad tracks and upgrade four stations, including Washington's Union Station and Baltimore's Penn Station.

As of 2014, U.S. railroad mileage has stabilized at approximately 160,000 miles (260,000 km).

=== High-speed rail ===
Map showing passenger lines in the United States.

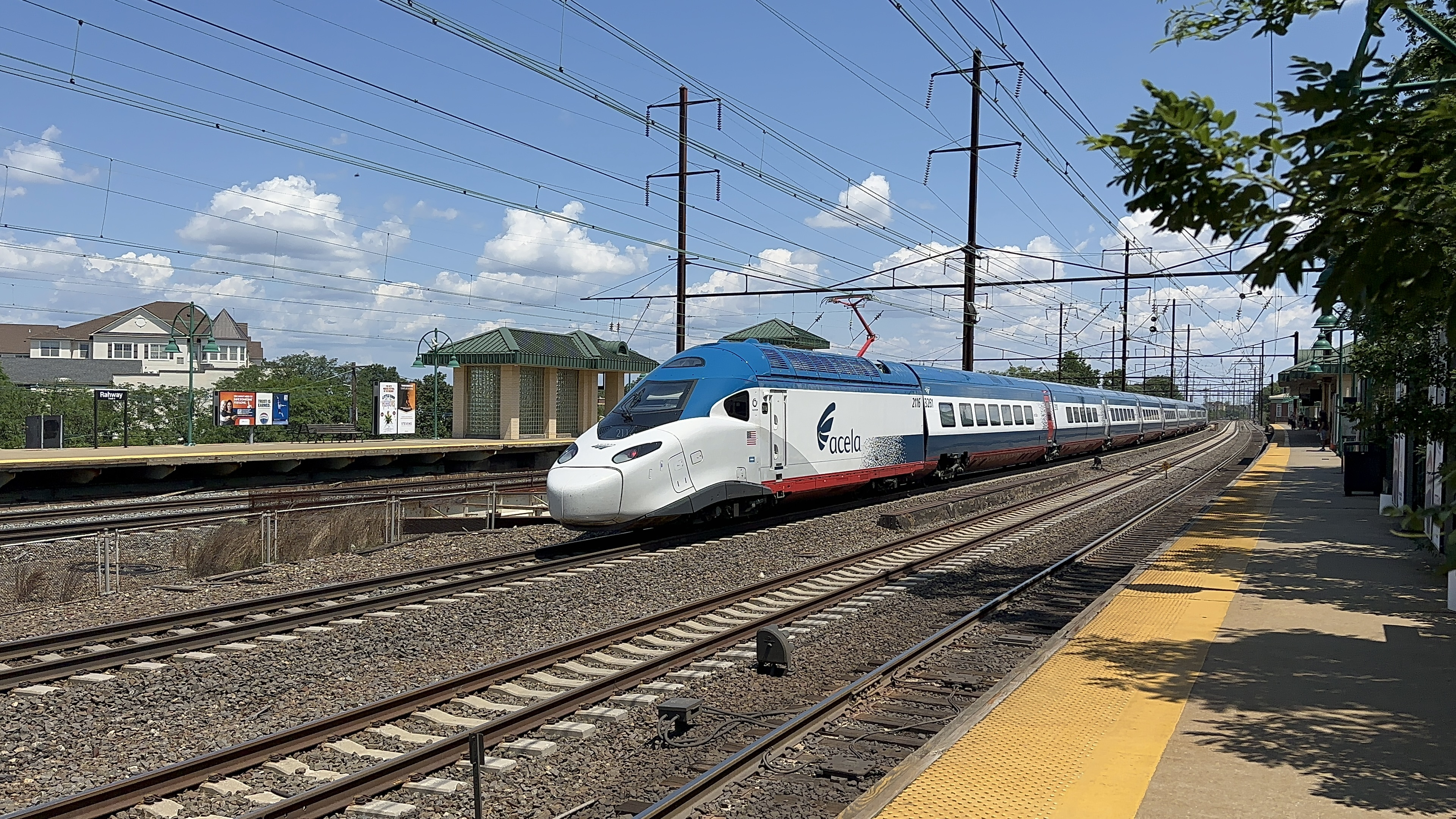
Amtrak Acela train

The fastest high speed rail service in the United States is Amtrak's Acela, between Washington, DC, and Boston, MA. It reaches a maximum speed of 160 mph (260 km/h), though only in some sections. Future upgrades could raise top speeds to 186 mph (299 km/h). Amtrak's slower Northeast Regional trains reach 125 mph (201 km/h) on the Northeast Corridor, qualifying as high-speed rail.

The state of California is constructing its own HSR system, California High-Speed Rail, designed to reach 220 mph (350 km/h) in some places. The first section in the Central Valley is due to open around 2027.

Brightline in Florida reaches speeds of 125 mph (201 km/h) on the section between Cocoa, Florida and Orlando.

==== Higher-speed rail ====
Amtrak diesel-electric routes operate higher-speed services with top speeds between 90 mph (140 km/h) to 110 mph (180 km/h), though some sources define 110 mph (180 km/h) as high-speed rail. For routes in the Western United States such as the Pacific Surfliner and Southwest Chief, those services can reach 90 mph (140 km/h) on portions of their routes, while the Texas Eagle can reach up to speeds of 100 miles per hour (160 km/h) on portions of its route. There has been plans to upgrade the portions of the route for the Pacific Surfliner to speeds up to 110 miles per hour (180 km/h) in Orange County and San Diego County, however funding has yet to be available. Meanwhile, for routes in the Midwestern United States and the Northeastern United States such as the Lincoln Service, Blue Water, Wolverine, Amtrak Hartford Line, Lake Shore Limited, and Empire Service can reach up to speeds of 110 miles per hour (180 km/h) on their entire routes or portions of their routes.

Some commuter rail lines in the United States achieve the speeds of higher-speed rail, but they are generally not classified as higher-speed rail. The MARC Penn Line that runs from Washington, D.C. to Baltimore, MD, can reach up to speeds of 125 mph (201 km/h). Similarly, on the Surf Line, the Metrolink Orange County and Inland Empire–Orange County lines can reach up to speeds of 90 miles per hour (140 km/h) on portions of the line between Santa Ana, California and Oceanside, California. The Coaster commuter rail also reaches 90 miles per hour (140 km/h) on its entire route between San Diego and Oceanside.

== Rolling stock reporting marks ==
Every piece of railroad rolling stock operating in North American interchange service is required to carry a standardized set of reporting marks. The marks are made up of a two- to four-letter code identifying the owner of the equipment accompanied by an identification number and statistics on the equipment's capacity and tare (unloaded) weight. Marks whose codes end in X (such as TTGX) are used on equipment owned by entities that are not common carrier railroads themselves. Marks whose codes end in U are used on containers that are carried in intermodal transport, and marks whose codes end in Z are used on trailers that are carried in intermodal transport, per ISO standard 6346). Most freight cars carry automatic equipment identification RFID transponders.

Typically, railroads operating in the United States reserve one- to four-digit identification numbers for powered equipment such as diesel locomotives and six-digit identification numbers for unpowered equipment. There is no hard and fast rule for how equipment is numbered; each railroad maintains its own numbering policy for its equipment.

== List of major United States railroads ==
- Amtrak
- Baltimore and Ohio
- BNSF Railway
- Canadian National Railway
- CPKC Railway
- CSX Transportation
- Illinois Central
- Norfolk Southern Railway
- Union Pacific Railroad

== Rail links with adjacent countries ==
- Canada – yes – Same gauge 4 ft 8 1/2 in (1,435 mm) (Isolated 3 ft (914 mm) gauge heritage line from Alaska)
- Mexico – yes – Same gauge 4 ft 8 1/2 in

== Regulation ==
Federal regulation of railroads is mainly through the United States Department of Transportation, especially the Federal Railroad Administration which regulates safety, and the Surface Transportation Board which regulates rates, service, the construction, acquisition and abandonment of rail lines, carrier mergers and interchange of traffic among carriers.

Railroads are also regulated by the individual states, for example through the Massachusetts Department of Public Utilities.

== Accidents ==
Minor derailments are a routine occurrence in the United States. 1,164 derailments were reported in 2022, an average of three a day; the vast majority did not cause injuries or deaths. This was down 44 percent from 2000, and more than 75 percent from the end of the 1970s. Steve Harrod, an associate professor in the Department of Engineering Technology at the Technical University of Denmark, has characterized the safety performance of North American freight railroads as "very bad by European standards," noting that rail safety in North America has historically lagged behind that of Europe.

== See also ==
- Timeline of United States railway history
- Railroad electrification in the United States
- List of rail transit systems in the United States
- Oldest railroads in North America
- History of rail transport in the United States
- Transportation in the United States
- Federal Employers Liability Act (protects and compensates railroad employees)
- Nationalized Industries in the United States
- Railroad car – general overview of all car types in use
