= Wetherbee House =

Wetherbee House may refer to:

- Wetherbee House (Greenville, Mississippi), listed on the NRHP in Mississippi
- Levi Wetherbee Farm, Boxborough, Massachusetts, listed on the NRHP in Massachusetts
- Wetherbee House (Waltham, Massachusetts), listed on the NRHP in Massachusetts
