= Coolidge School =

- U.S. National Register of Historic Places
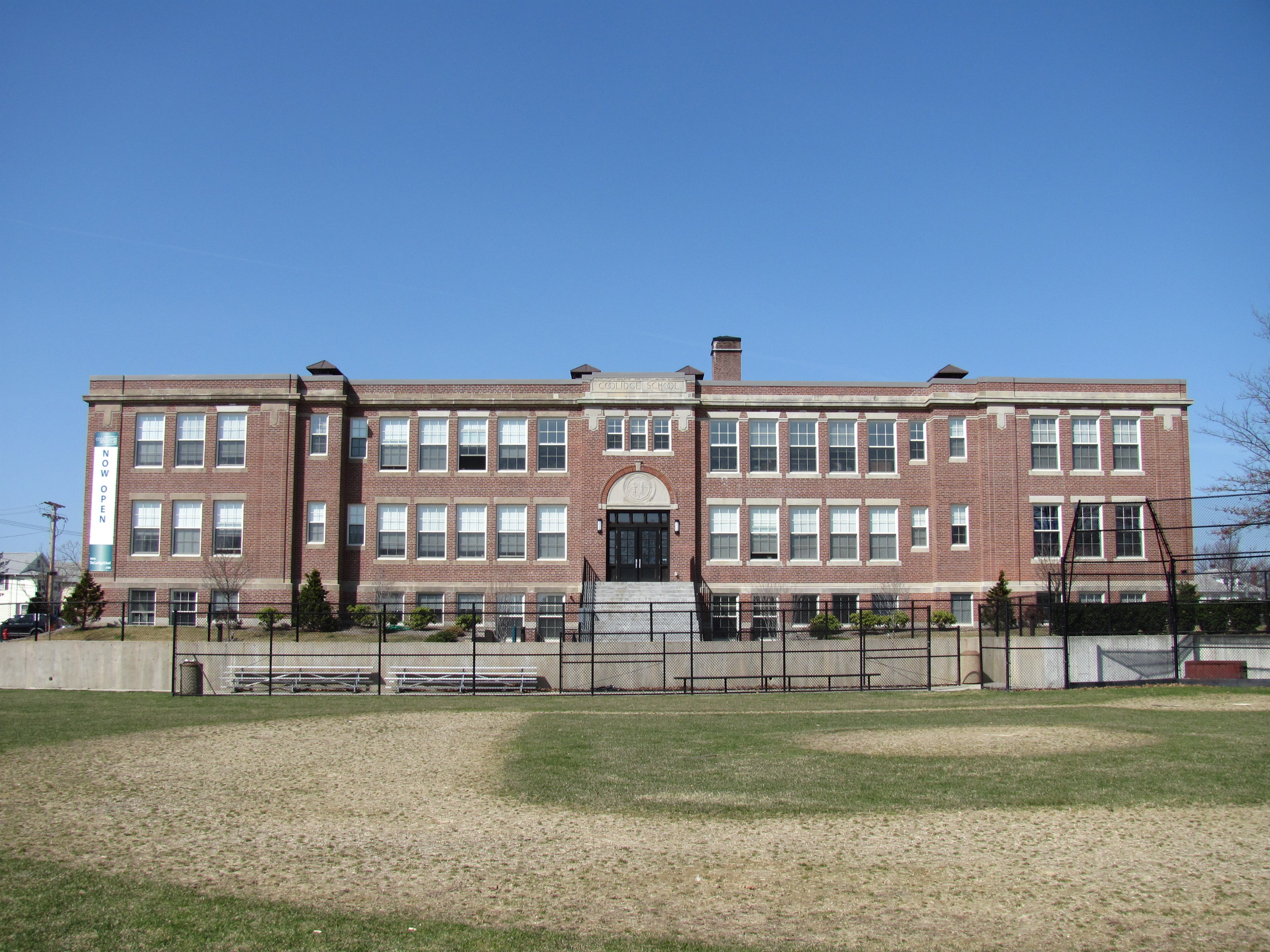

- Location within Massachusetts Location within the United States
- Location: Watertown, Massachusetts
- Coordinates: 42°22′24″N 71°09′26″W
- Built: 1913
- Architect: Hoyt, Clarence; Bixby, Curtis
- Architectural style: Classical Revival
- NRHP reference No.: 09000055
- Added to NRHP: February 25, 2009

The Coolidge School is a historic former school building at 319 Arlington Street in Watertown, Massachusetts. It is a large two story Classical Revival brick building with pressed stone trim, on a granite foundation. It was designed in its present configuration by local architects Clarence Hoyt and Curtis Bixby, and built in two phases. The first phase, built in 1915, was a U-shape structure that is the western portion of the building. In 1925, the eastern wing was added, giving the building its present E shape. The building replaced a previous four-room wood-frame schoolhouse located on School Lane (now Bostonia Avenue) near Mount Auburn Street. The new building, with ten rooms and capacity for over 400 students, was used as an elementary school until 1984. It was afterward used for a variety of purposes, including office space and some educational use, until it was formally closed in 2000.

The building was listed on the National Register of Historic Places in 2009. The building has been converted to residential use.

== See also ==
- Old Watertown High School
- National Register of Historic Places listings in Middlesex County, Massachusetts
