= Rev. Stephen Badger House =

Historic house in Massachusetts, United States

- U.S. National Register of Historic Places
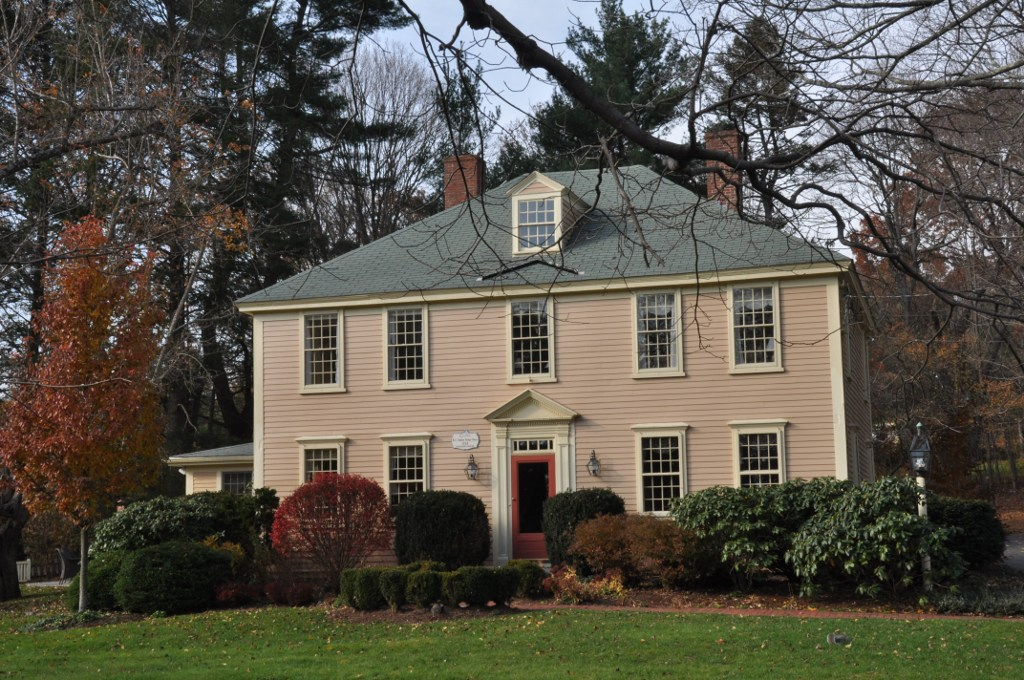

- Location within Massachusetts Location within the United States
- Location: 87 Eliot St., Natick, Massachusetts
- Coordinates: 42°16′11″N 71°19′7″W
- Area: 1.25 acres (0.51 ha)
- Built: 1753
- NRHP reference No.: 80000647
- Added to NRHP: April 1, 1980

The Rev. Stephen Badger House is a historic house at 87 Eliot Street in Natick, Massachusetts. Built in 1753, it was the home of Natick's last missionary to the local "Praying Indian" community, and is a prominent well-preserved surviving example of Georgian architecture. It was listed on the National Register of Historic Places in 1980.

== Description and history ==
The Rev. Stephen Badger House stands on the south side of the village of South Natick, at the southwest corner of Eliot Street and Badger Avenue. It is a two-story wood-frame structure, five bays wide, with a hip roof, two interior chimneys, and clapboarded exterior. The entrance is flanked by pilasters, and topped by a transom window and gabled pediment. A gabled dormer projects from the center of the roof. A single-story ell extends to the rear of the main block.

The town of Natick was founded in 1650 as a community of Christianized Praying Indians, with its original town center at South Natick. Supported by an English missionary organization, it had four ministers before Stephen Badger arrived in 1753. He was granted a parcel of land that includes the place where this house now stands. Badger's tenure as missionary was troubled by the American Revolutionary War, when he was accused of being a Loyalist, and by increasing white settlement in the town. At least in part due to his loss of status, the town's main meeting house was moved to the present center, leading to South Natick's decline in civic importance. The property was sold out of the Badger family in 1822, to Oliver Bacon, a local businessman whose philanthropy includes South Natick's Bacon Free Library. In 1949 the house was restored to its c. 1870 appearance.

== See also ==
- National Register of Historic Places listings in Middlesex County, Massachusetts
