= West Schoolhouse (Wilmington, Massachusetts) =

- U.S. National Register of Historic Places
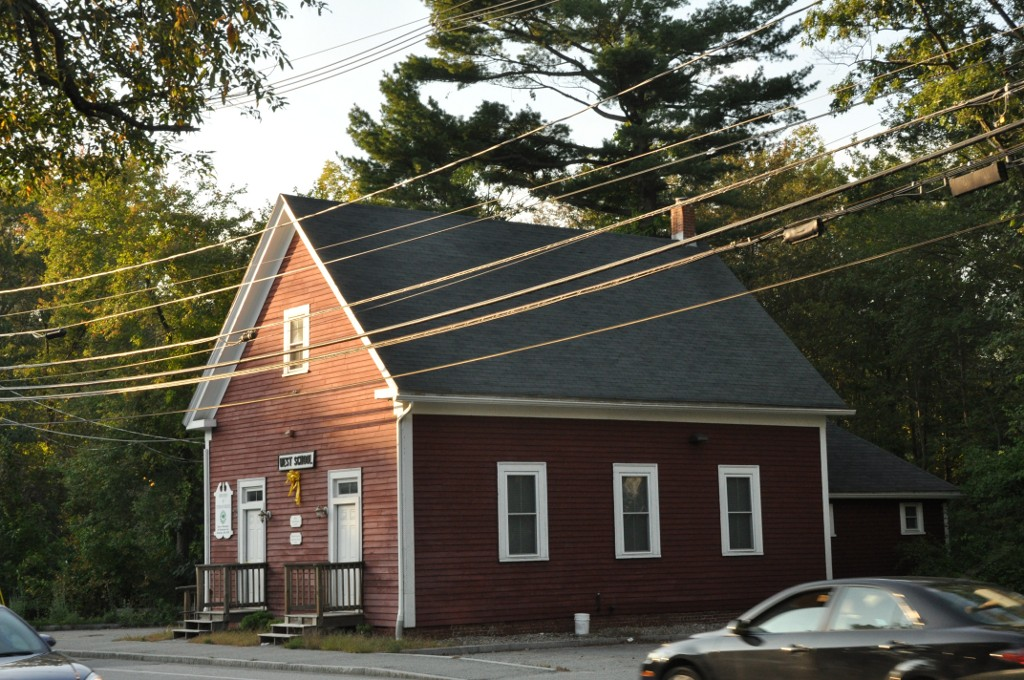

- Location within Massachusetts Location within the United States
- Location: 141 Shawsheen Avenue, Wilmington, Massachusetts
- Coordinates: 42°33′22″N 71°11′25″W
- Built: 1875
- Architectural style: Late Victorian
- NRHP reference No.: 90000144
- Added to NRHP: February 21, 1990

The West Schoolhouse is a historic school building in Wilmington, Massachusetts. It is the best-preserved of Wilmington's remaining one-room schoolhouses. This single-story wood-frame building was probably (based on stylistic analysis) built in the 1860s or 1870s, although its resemblance in form to the c. 1840s Old Centre Schoolhouse suggests a possible earlier construction date and subsequent remodeling. It has simple Greek Revival styling with rope molding on the corner boards, and transom windows over the pair of entry doors.

The building was listed on the National Register of Historic Places in 1990.

== See also ==
- National Register of Historic Places listings in Middlesex County, Massachusetts
