= Pleasant Street School (Ayer, Massachusetts) =

- U.S. National Register of Historic Places
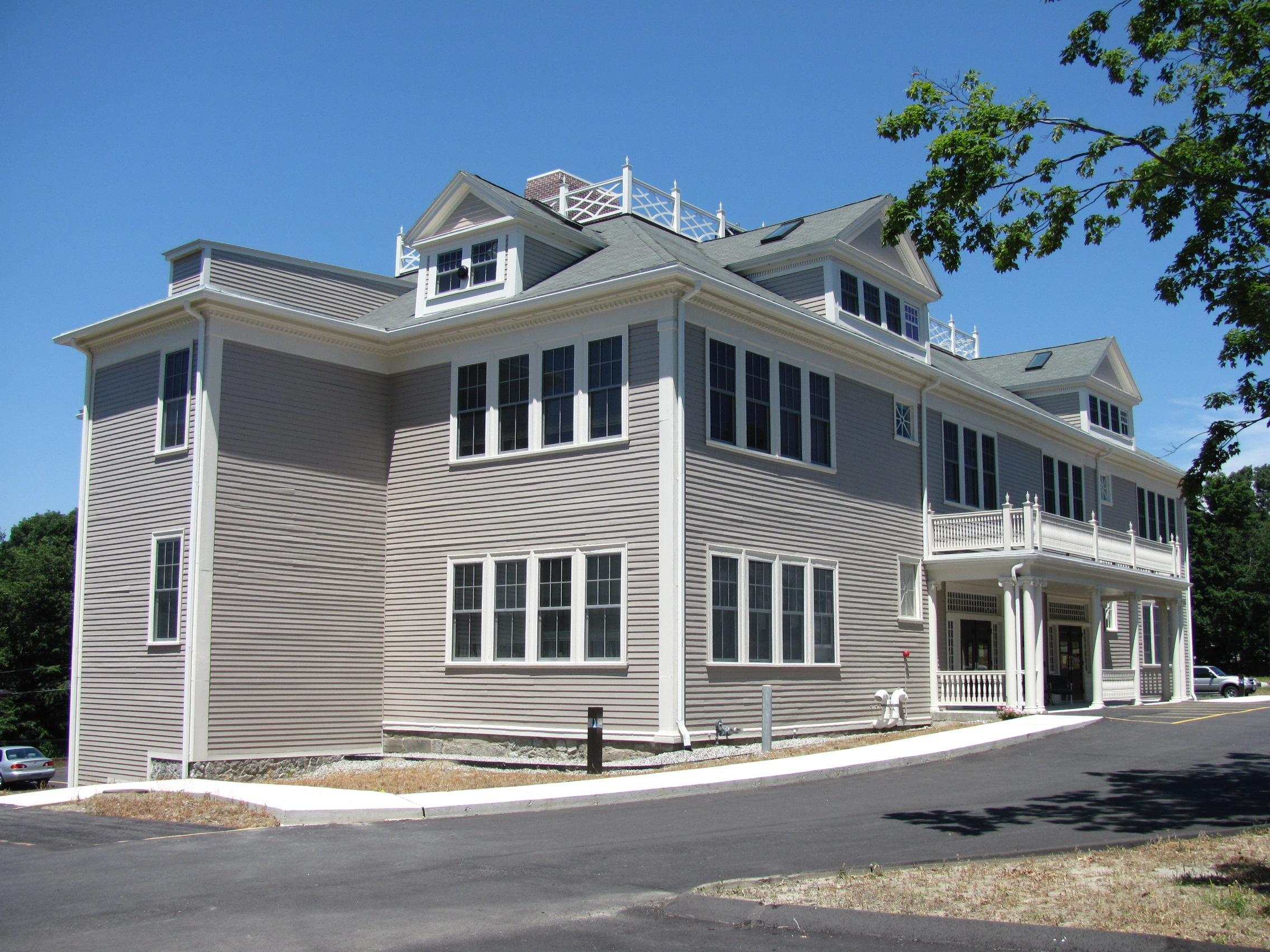
- Pleasant Street School

- Location within Massachusetts Location within the United States
- Location: Ayer, Massachusetts
- Coordinates: 42°33′51″N 71°35′15″W
- Area: 2.75 acres (1.11 ha)
- Built: 1893
- Architectural style: Colonial Revival
- NRHP reference No.: 86000094
- Added to NRHP: January 23, 1986

The Pleasant Street School is a historic school building on Pleasant Street in Ayer, Massachusetts. It is a 2 1/2-story Colonial Revival building, with a hip roof pierced by wide gabled dormers with bands of small windows. It was constructed in 1893 to a design by Boston architect Charles E. Parks and is one of the oldest school buildings in the town. It was enlarged in 1906, doubling it in size. It served as a public school until 1984.

The building was listed on the National Register of Historic Places in 1986.

== See also ==
- National Register of Historic Places listings in Middlesex County, Massachusetts
