= Miles Pratt House =

Historic house in Massachusetts, United States

- U.S. National Register of Historic Places
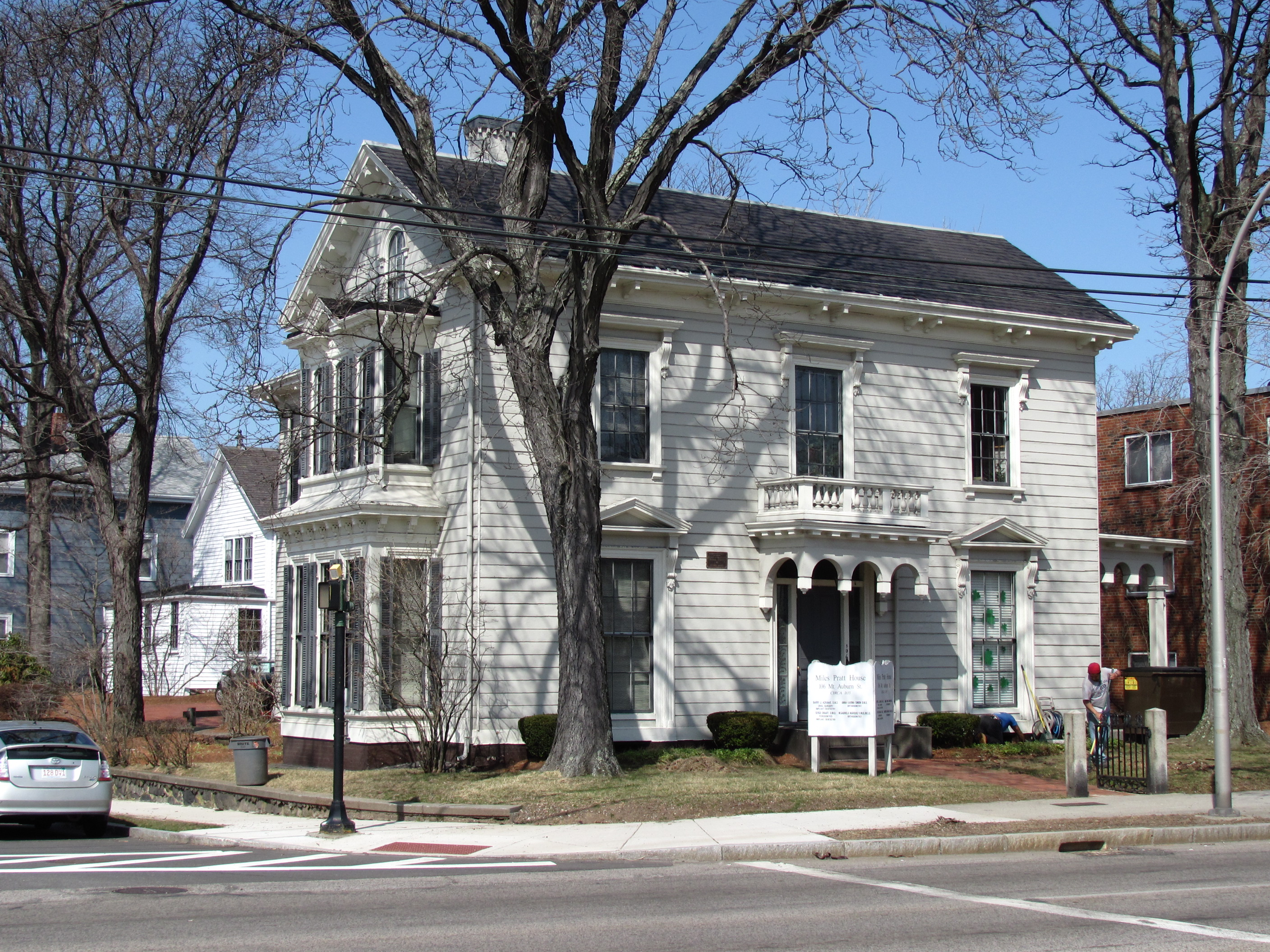
- Miles Pratt House

- Location within Massachusetts Location within the United States
- Location: 106 Mt. Auburn Street, Watertown, Massachusetts
- Coordinates: 42°22′3″N 71°10′49″W
- Built: 1863
- Architectural style: Italianate
- NRHP reference No.: 85000980
- Added to NRHP: May 9, 1985

The Miles Pratt House is a historic house in Watertown, Massachusetts. The 2 1/2 story wood-frame house was built sometime between 1860 and 1874, and is Watertown's finest surviving Italianate residence. It has wide eaves with paired brackets, and a front entry hood with arched pendants reminiscent of an Italian palazzo. Miles Pratt was the founder of the Walker and Pratt Company, manufacturer of stoves, furnaces, and heaters who prospered in the American Civil War, supplying the Union Army with ammunition and gun carriage castings.

The house was listed on the National Register of Historic Places in 1985.

== See also ==
- National Register of Historic Places listings in Middlesex County, Massachusetts
