= Wright Cemetery =

Historic cemetery in Massachusetts, United States

- U.S. National Register of Historic Places
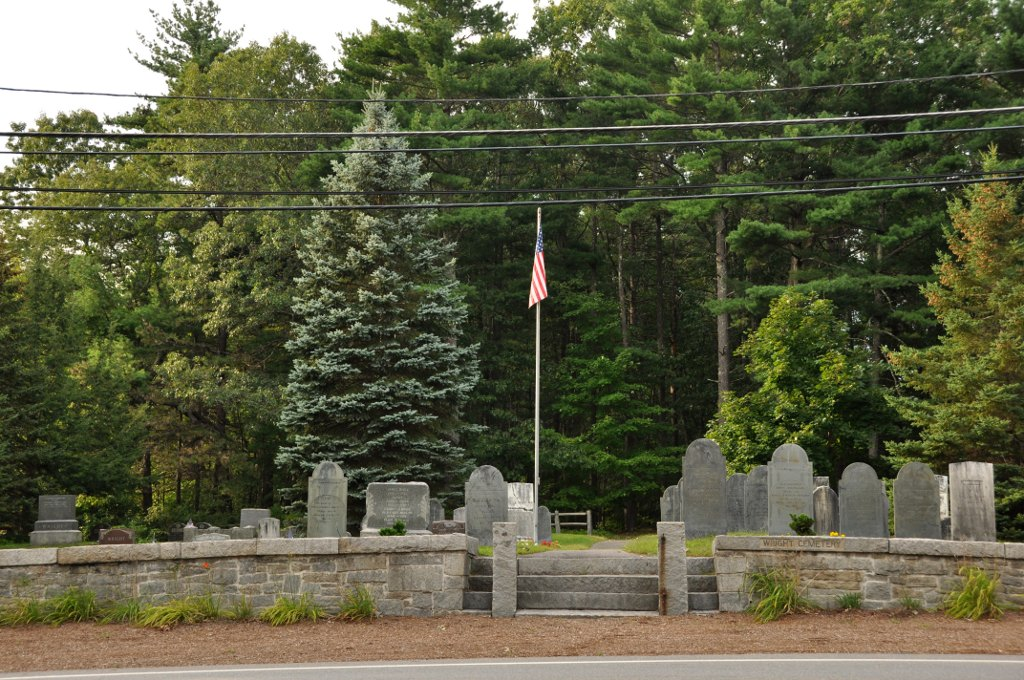

- Location within Massachusetts Location within the United States
- Location: Westford, Massachusetts
- Coordinates: 42°36′32″N 71°28′3″W
- Area: less than one acre
- Architect: Day, B; Warren, T, et al.
- NRHP reference No.: 05001372
- Added to NRHP: December 6, 2005

Wright Cemetery is a historic cemetery on Groton Road near Lynwood Lane in Westford, Massachusetts. The cemetery was formally established in 1836 as a private cemetery for the locally numerous Wright family, although its earliest documented burial dates to 1819. Maintenance and operation of the cemetery was taken over by the town in 1909. The half-acre plot has approximately 150 marked grave sites, and remains in use. The cemetery was added to the National Register of Historic Places in 2005.

== Description and history ==
Wright Cemetery is located in northwestern Westford, just north of the junction of Lynwood Lane and Groton Road (Massachusetts Route 40), a major artery through that part of the town. The cemetery occupies about 0.5 acres (0.20 ha) of a larger 4.5-acre (1.8 ha) parcel, the rest of which is wooded. The cemetery is roughly rectangular, with a capstoned fieldstone wall along the road, and a fence of granite posts and wooden rails on the other three sides. A wooden gate in the wall provides the primary access to the grounds, along with a few pedestrian entrances.

Family plots are generally demarcated by granite curbing of various heights. The Albion Wright family plot is the most prominent of these, with curbs 2 feet (0.61 m) in height, with pyramidal piers at the corners, and granite steps to access the plot. The most common early markers are slate, with a shoulder-arch form at the top. Eighteen of these markers appear, with dates from 1819 to 1854. Later in the 19th century marble markers became more common, with granite predominating in 20th century markers. The largest grave marker is a granite obelisk 10 feet (3.0 m) in height; it is for Joel Wright (1782–1834)

The cemetery was formally authorized by the town as a private cemetery for the Wright family in 1837, but there are eight markers that predate this formality, including members of the Wright and Wight families. One burial, that of Lieutenant Nahum Wight, is confirmed to be of an American Revolutionary War veteran; there are also several graves of War of 1812 veterans.

== See also ==
- National Register of Historic Places listings in Middlesex County, Massachusetts
