= Russian Cemetery =

Historic cemetery in Westford, Massachusetts

- U.S. National Register of Historic Places
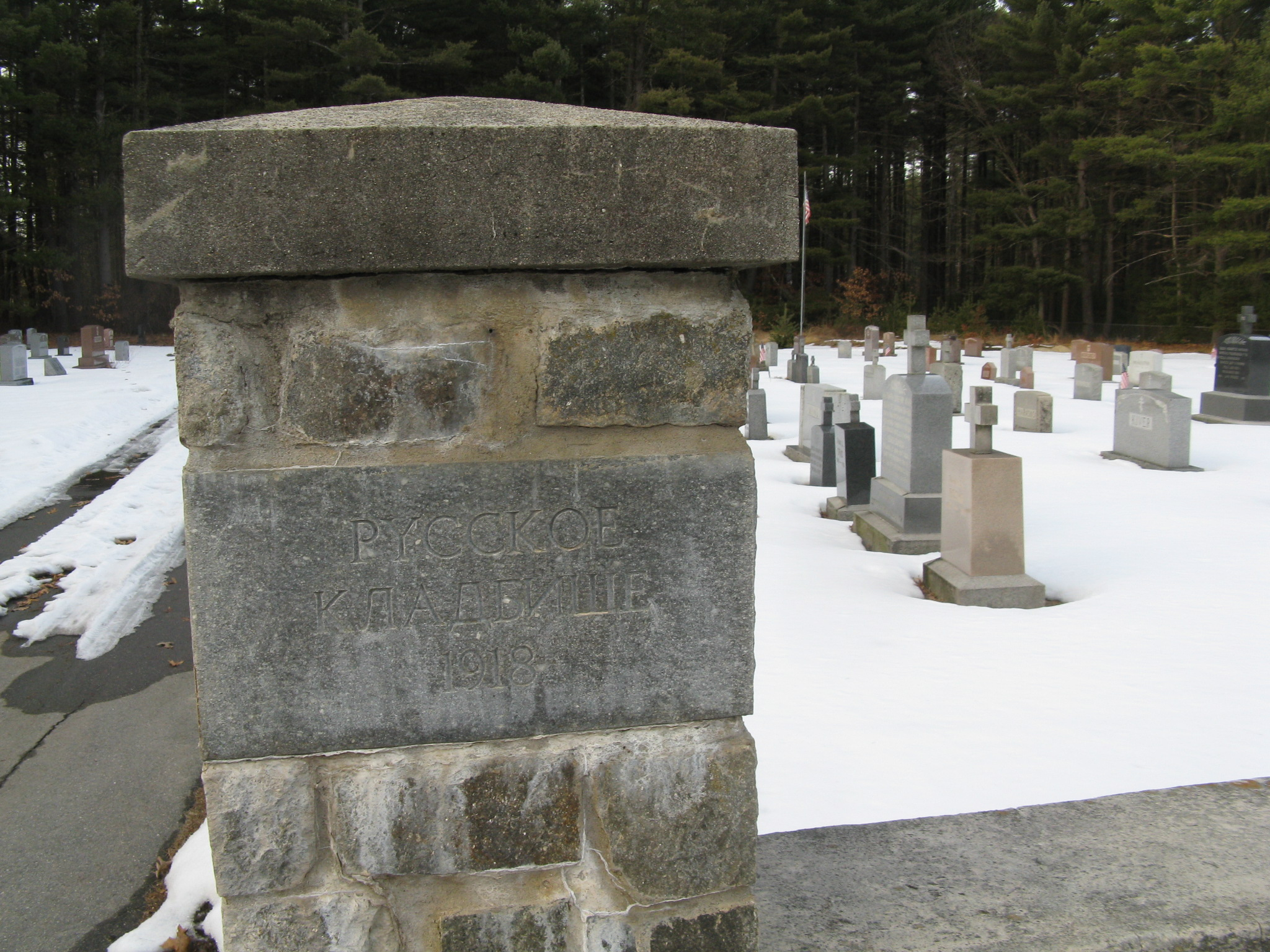
- Russian Cemetery

- Location within Massachusetts Location within the United States
- Location: Westford, Massachusetts
- Coordinates: 42°34′41″N 71°28′17″W
- Area: 1.33 acres (0.54 ha)
- NRHP reference No.: 05001324
- Added to NRHP: November 25, 2005

The Russian Cemetery is a historic cemetery on Patten Road in Westford, Massachusetts. The cemetery was established in 1918 by the Russian Brotherhood, a social organization that served as a focal point for Belorussian immigrants who had been recruited by agents for the Abbot Worsted Company to work in its Westford mills. These primarily Russian Orthodox Christians were not allowed to have burials in some of the town's other cemeteries, prompting the creation of this one, which is distinctive in the town as the only cemetery catering to a specific ethnic group. It has approximately 300 burials, with a significant number of early burials marked with gravestones bearing Cyrillic lettering. The cemetery remains open to members of the local Russian-American community.

The cemetery was added to the National Register of Historic Places in 2005.

== See also ==
- National Register of Historic Places listings in Middlesex County, Massachusetts
