= Center School (Burlington, Massachusetts) =

- U.S. National Register of Historic Places
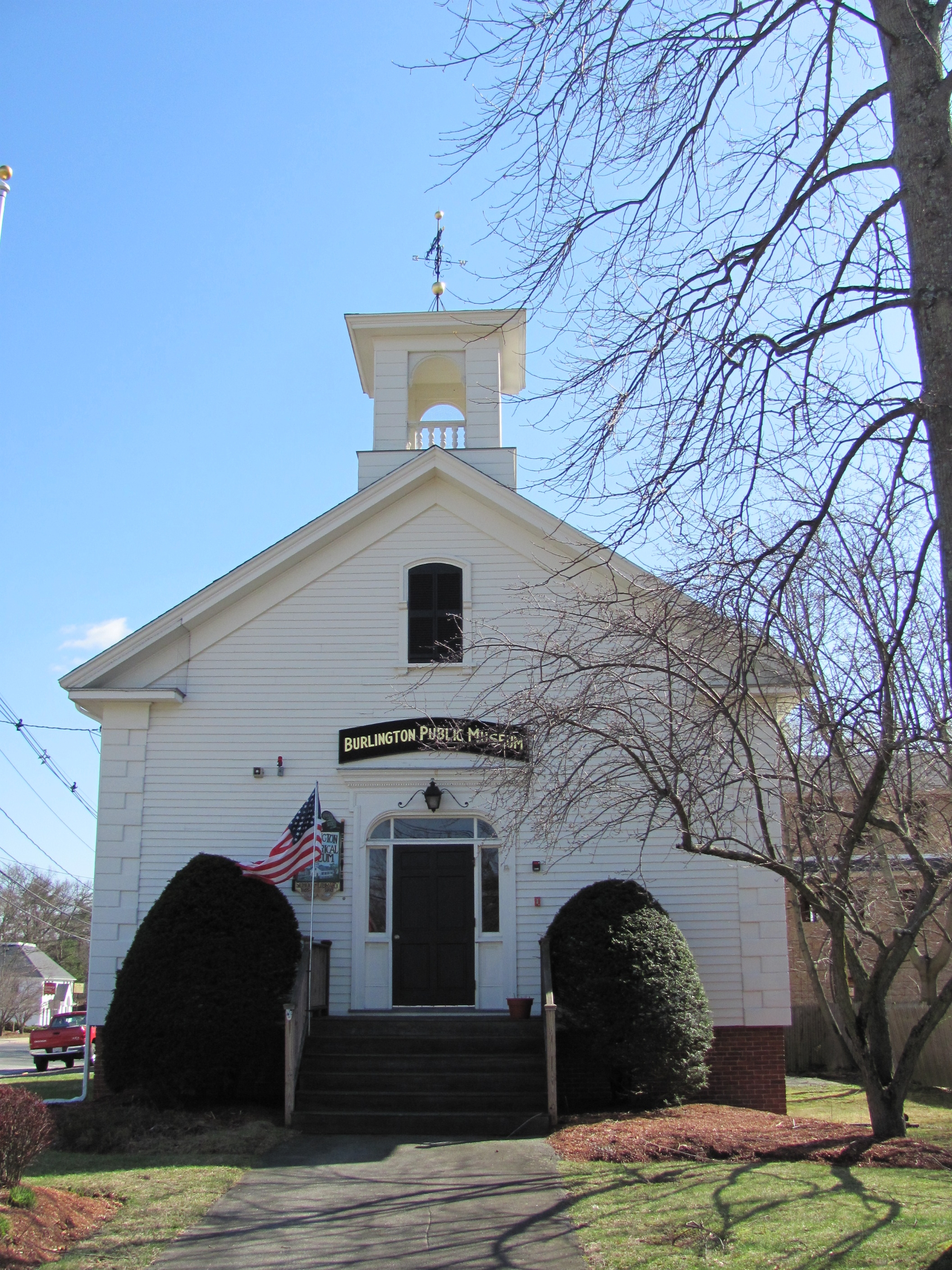
- Center School

- Location within Massachusetts Location within the United States
- Location: Burlington, Massachusetts
- Coordinates: 42°30′17″N 71°11′46″W
- Built: 1855
- Architect: Clark, David
- Architectural style: Greek Revival, Italianate
- NRHP reference No.: 06000523
- Added to NRHP: June 21, 2006

The Center School is a historic school building at 13 Bedford Street in Burlington, Massachusetts. The one-room wood-frame schoolhouse was built in 1855, and occupies a prominent place in the center of Burlington. The building is basically Greek Revival in style, with some Italianate features. It modified in 1898 when it was adapted for use as a library. At that time, the typical paired entrances were replaced by a single entrance with a Colonial Revival treatment. The building served as a library until 1968, and was pressed into service in 1970 to temporarily house the police department. Its tenancy was short-lived, with the premises abandoned after the building was damaged by a Molotov cocktail. The building has since then served as the town's history museum.

The building was listed on the National Register of Historic Places in 2006.

== See also ==
- National Register of Historic Places listings in Middlesex County, Massachusetts
