= Parker Village Historic District =

Historic district in Massachusetts, United States

- U.S. National Register of Historic Places
- U.S. Historic district
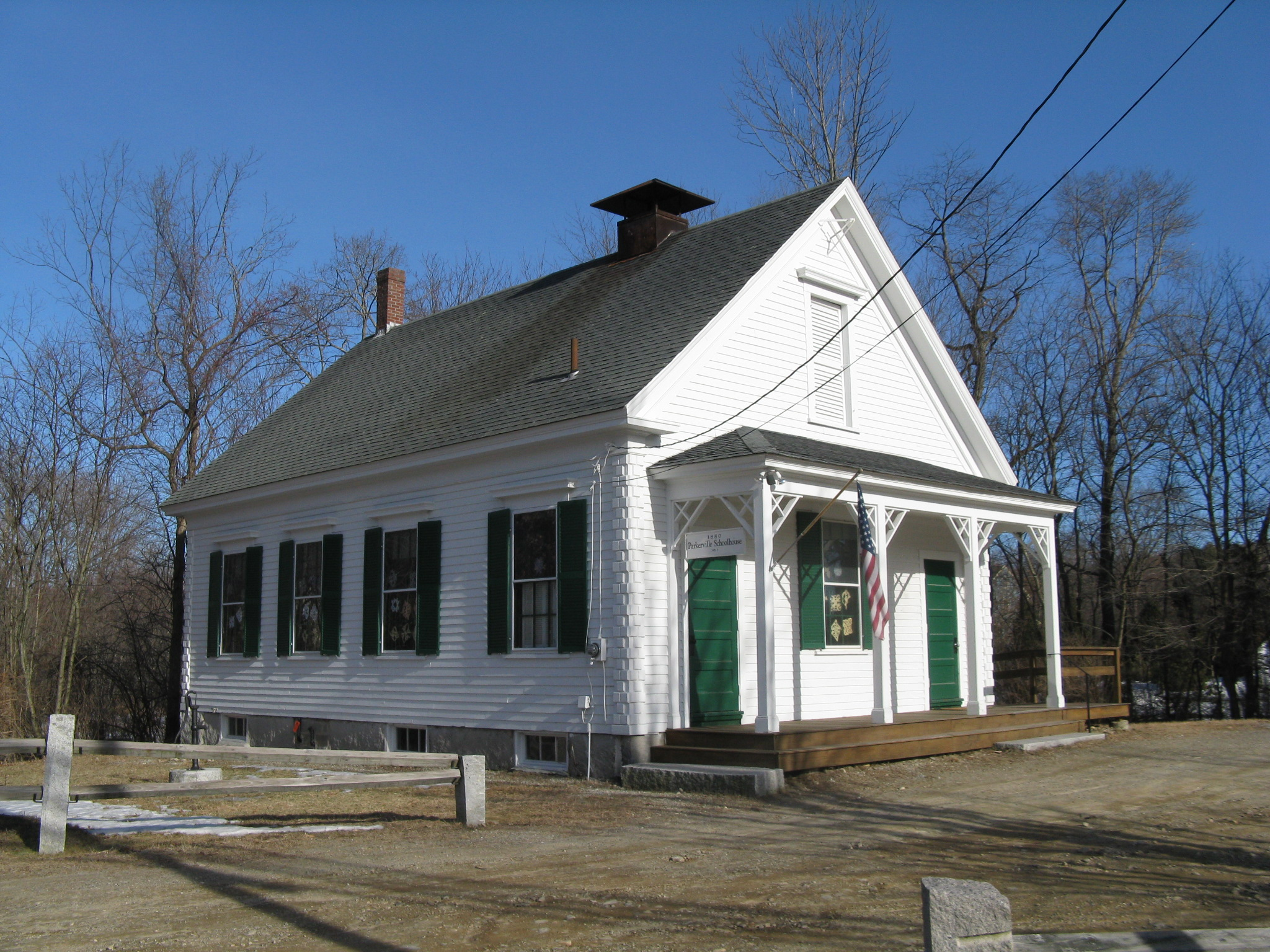
- Parkerville Schoolhouse, built in 1880

- Location within Massachusetts Location within the United States
- Location: Westford, Massachusetts
- Coordinates: 42°32′56″N 71°25′1″W
- Area: 33 acres (13 ha)
- Architect: Steven, E.A.
- Architectural style: Federal, Bungalow/Craftsman
- NRHP reference No.: 02001613
- Added to NRHP: December 27, 2002

The Parker Village Historic District of Westford, Massachusetts encompasses a historic rural village center. The district extends from the junction of Carlisle Road and Griffin Road, westward along Carlisle Road to a triangular green where it meets Concord Road and Old Lowell Road. The oldest building in the village is the Parker Village Schoolhouse, built in 1787 out of brick and wood, and restored in the 1990s. The majority of the houses in the district date from the 18th and 19th centuries, with eclectic Victorian styles predominating.

The district was listed on the National Register of Historic Places in 2002.

Each year elementary students from Westford Public Schools visit the site for a field-trip, dressed up as students from the era.

== See also ==
- National Register of Historic Places listings in Middlesex County, Massachusetts
