= Wilbur Fiske Haven House =

Historic house in Massachusetts, United States

- U.S. National Register of Historic Places
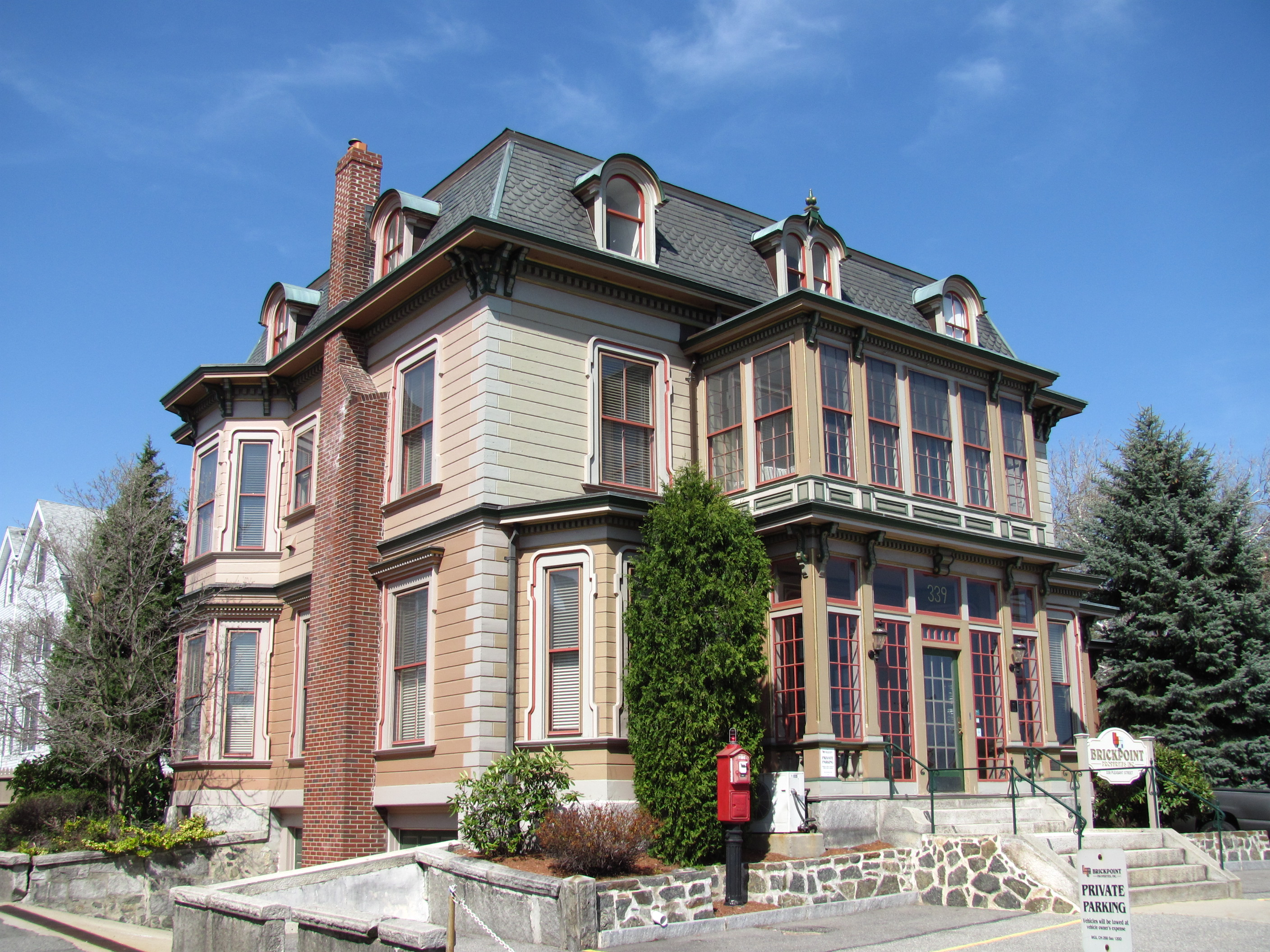
- Wilbur Fiske Haven House

- Location within Massachusetts Location within the United States
- Location: Malden, Massachusetts
- Coordinates: 42°25′40″N 71°4′35″W
- Architect: George Hanson Fall
- Architectural style: Second Empire
- NRHP reference No.: 92001659
- Added to NRHP: December 17, 1992

The Wilbur Fiske Haven House is a historic house at 339 Pleasant Street in Malden, Massachusetts. Built in the 1860s, this Second Empire house is a remnant survivor of a series of fashionable mid-19th century Victorian houses, known as "Doctor's Row". The house was listed on the National Register of Historic Places in 1992. It is now used for professional offices.

== Description and history ==
The Haven House is set on the north side of Pleasant Street, just west of the Malden Center MBTA station. Its historic position was at the head of a series of similar houses along Pleasant Street, which is now lined mainly with commercial buildings. The house is a 2 1/2-story wood-frame structure, topped with a slate mansard roof and resting on a granite foundation. The roof is pierced in several places by round-arch dormers, including a doubled one above the main entrance. The walls are finished in flushboard, with quoined corners. The front facade is three bays wide, with the central bay covered by a projecting glassed-in porch two stories in height. The flanking bays each have a projecting bay window on the first floor. Roof lines of the main roof, porch, and bays are dentillated and studded with brackets. An addition to the building, made during its 1989 restoration, was done in a stylistically sensitive way.

The house was built for Wilbur Fiske Haven, a Boston hardware merchant, during a period of growth in Malden center occasioned by the arrival of the railroad. A later resident was William Ferguson, a railroad contractor who laid miles of track in Malden and adjacent towns. In the early 1900s a large number of doctors lived in the area, including in this house, leading the neighborhood to be dubbed "Doctor's Row". The house was repurposes as a funeral home in 1929, and has mostly housed professional offices in the 21st century.

In 2023, it became the home of the Mystic Side Opera company.

== See also ==
- National Register of Historic Places listings in Middlesex County, Massachusetts
