= Waite Brick Block =

- Waitt Brick Block
- U.S. National Register of Historic Places
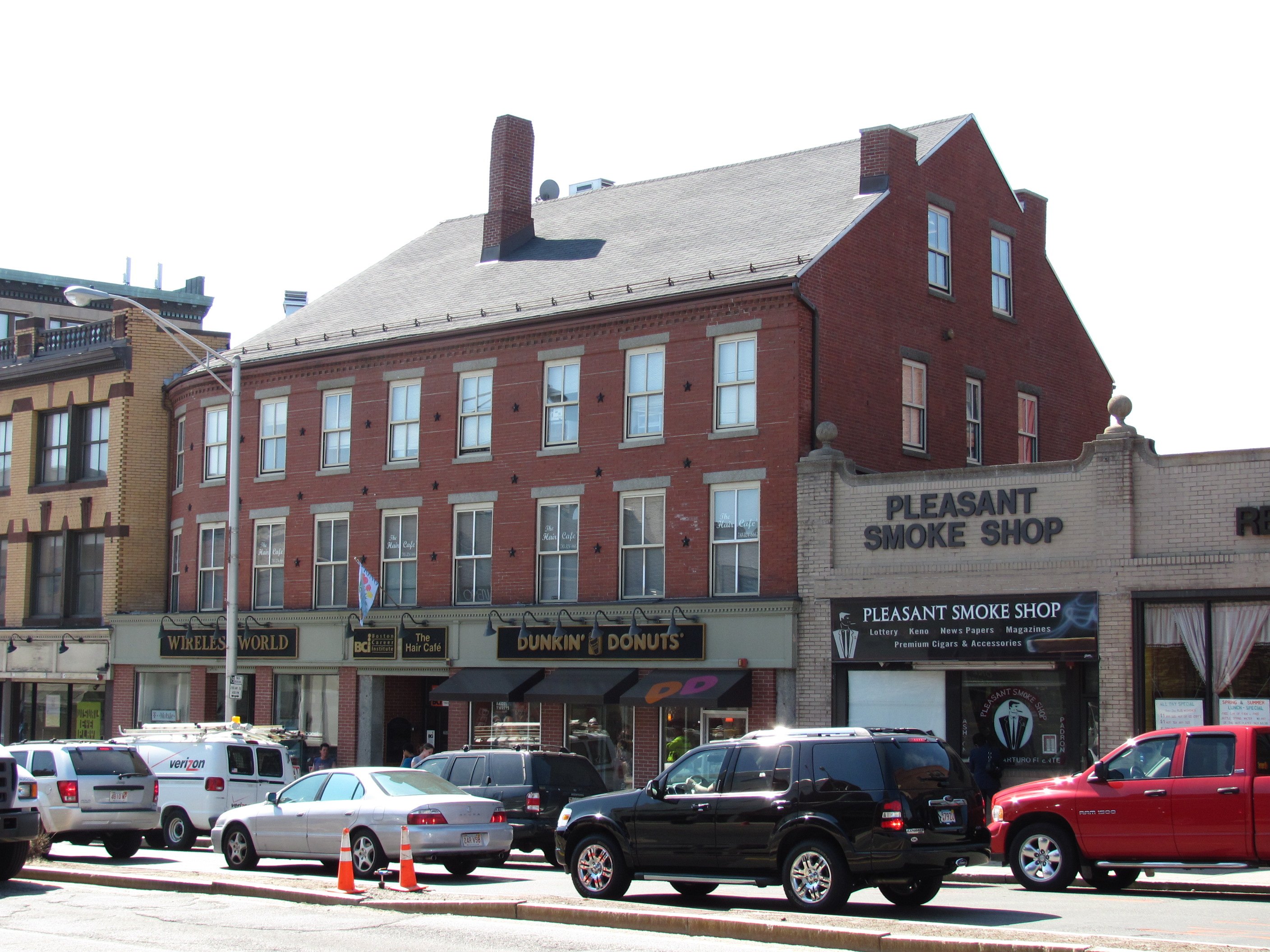
- Waitt Brick Block

- Location within Massachusetts Location within the United States
- Location: Malden, Massachusetts
- Coordinates: 42°25′35″N 71°4′5″W
- Built: 1848
- Architectural style: Greek Revival
- NRHP reference No.: 82000492
- Added to NRHP: November 12, 1982

The Waite Brick Block is a historic commercial building at 422-424 Main Street in Malden, Massachusetts. Built in 1848, it is the oldest brick building in the city. The three-story Greek Revival building has a hip roof, from which three tapered chimneys project. One corner of the building is curved, following the original junction of Main and Pleasant Streets. Windows are topped by granite lintels, and the cornice has a line of brick dentil work.

The building was listed on the National Register of Historic Places in 1982, misspelled as "Waitt".

== See also ==
- National Register of Historic Places listings in Middlesex County, Massachusetts
