= Malden City Infirmary =

- U.S. National Register of Historic Places
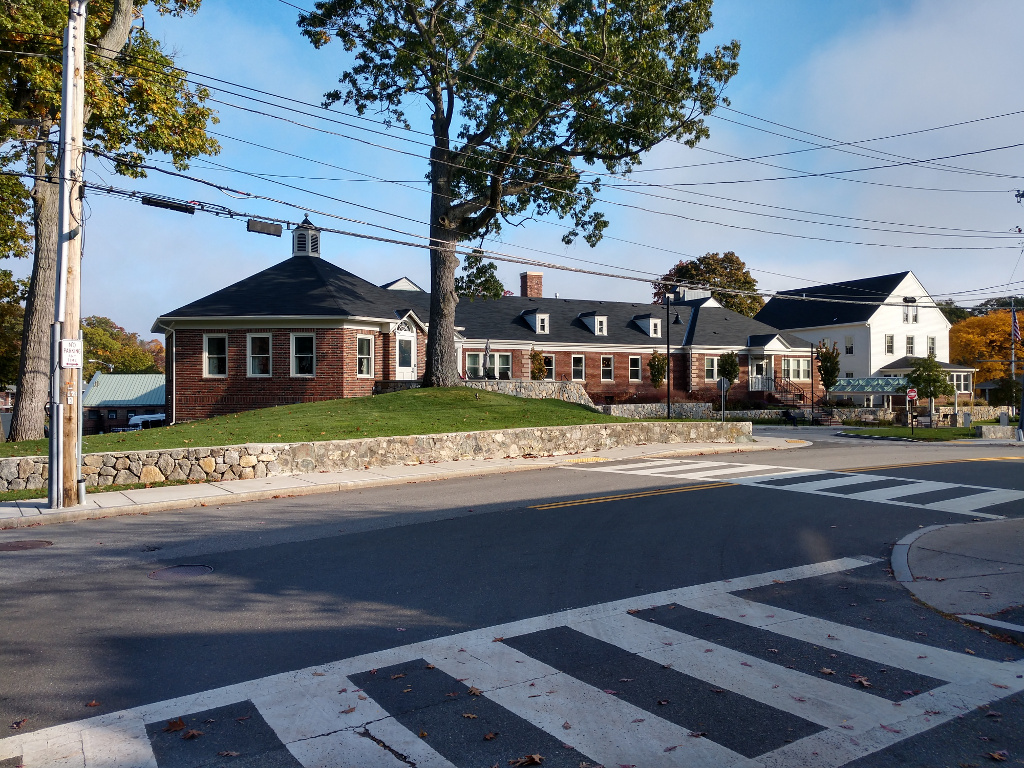

- Location within Massachusetts Location within the United States
- Location: 341 Forest St., Malden, Massachusetts
- Coordinates: 42°26′28″N 71°3′20″W
- Area: 3.9 acres (1.6 ha)
- Built: c. 1696
- Architect: Spingall, Cyrus; Smart, W.G.H.
- NRHP reference No.: 100005476
- Added to NRHP: August 27, 2020

The Malden City Infirmary is a historic municipal facility at 341 Forest Street in Malden, Massachusetts. Established by the city in the 18th century as a poor farm, the surviving elements of the property include the 1870 Warden's House, and the 1933 infirmary, which continues to serve as an elderly care and nursing facility known as Forestdale Senior Living. The property was listed on the National Register of Historic Places in 2020.

== Description and history ==
The Malden City Infirmary property is located in northeastern Malden, on the east side of Forest Street at Goodhue Street. The current 2.5 acres (1.0 ha) site is a surviving fragment of the original poor farm, which reached its maximum extent at 20 acres (8.1 ha), and include land on the west side of Forest Street that now includes Forestdale Cemetery. The property includes a two-story wood frame Italianate style house, built in 1870 for the poor farm's warden. Its major feature is the infirmary, a single-story U-shaped brick building constructed in 1933, which is connected to the house by a wood-frame connector. Attached to the other side of the infirmary is a brick sunroom, which was probably built earlier in the 20th century during a flu epidemic.

This are was first used for the care of indigent residents in 1772, and it was formally organized as a poor farm and almshouse in 1780. In 1897 its facilities included a house with 25 beds, and 20 acres of surrounding land. In the first half of the 20th century, the property was repeatedly subdivided for a variety of public uses, including the cemetery, public housing, and a school. The use of almshouses declined in the late 19th and early 20th centuries, and the property was repurposed with the 1933 construction of the infirmary. It was operated by the city as a nursing home for its indigent aging population until 2009. It has since been rehabilitated for use as an assisted living facility.

== See also ==
- National Register of Historic Places listings in Middlesex County, Massachusetts
