= Colonel Timothy Jones House =

Historic house in Massachusetts, United States

- U.S. National Register of Historic Places
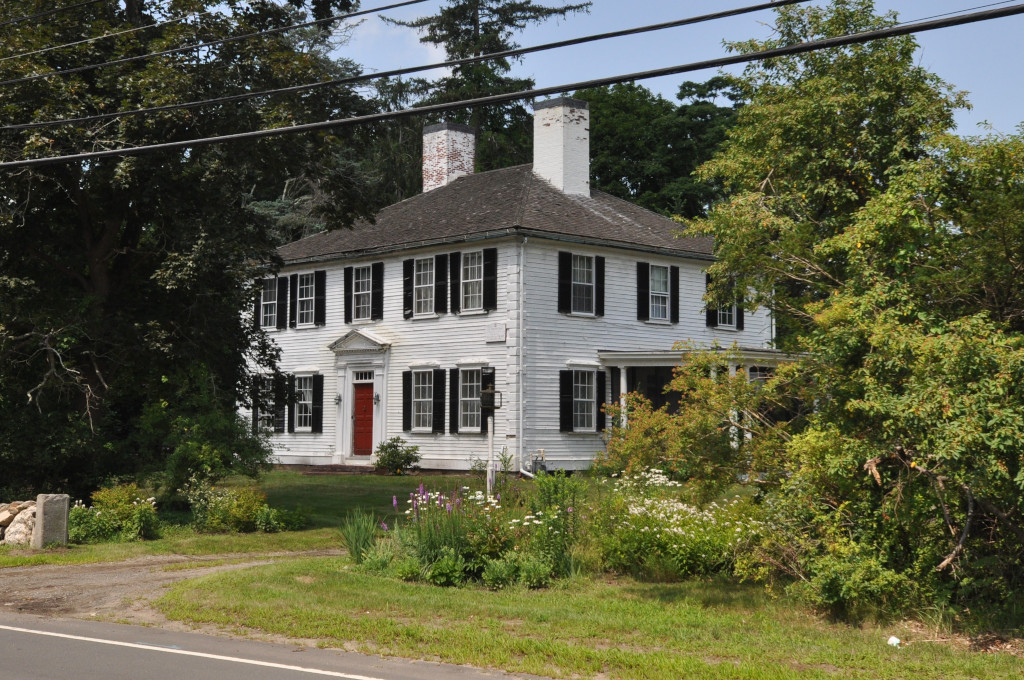

- Location within Massachusetts Location within the United States
- Location: 231 Concord Road, Bedford, Massachusetts
- Coordinates: 42°29′3″N 71°17′57″W
- Built: c. 1775
- Built by: Reuben Duren
- Architectural style: Colonial; Colonial Revival
- NRHP reference No.: 100006594
- Added to NRHP: September 9, 2021

The Colonel Timothy Jones House is a historic house at 231 Concord Road in Bedford, Massachusetts. It was built about 1775 for a prominent local military officer and civic official, and was a well-preserved example of period architecture with Colonial Revival alterations until a gut renovation ca. 2022–2023. It was also historically associated with Shady Hill Nursery, one of the largest nurseries in New England at the turn of the 20th century. It was listed on the National Register of Historic Places in 2021.

== See also ==
- National Register of Historic Places listings in Middlesex County, Massachusetts
