= Dunstable Town Hall =

- U.S. National Register of Historic Places
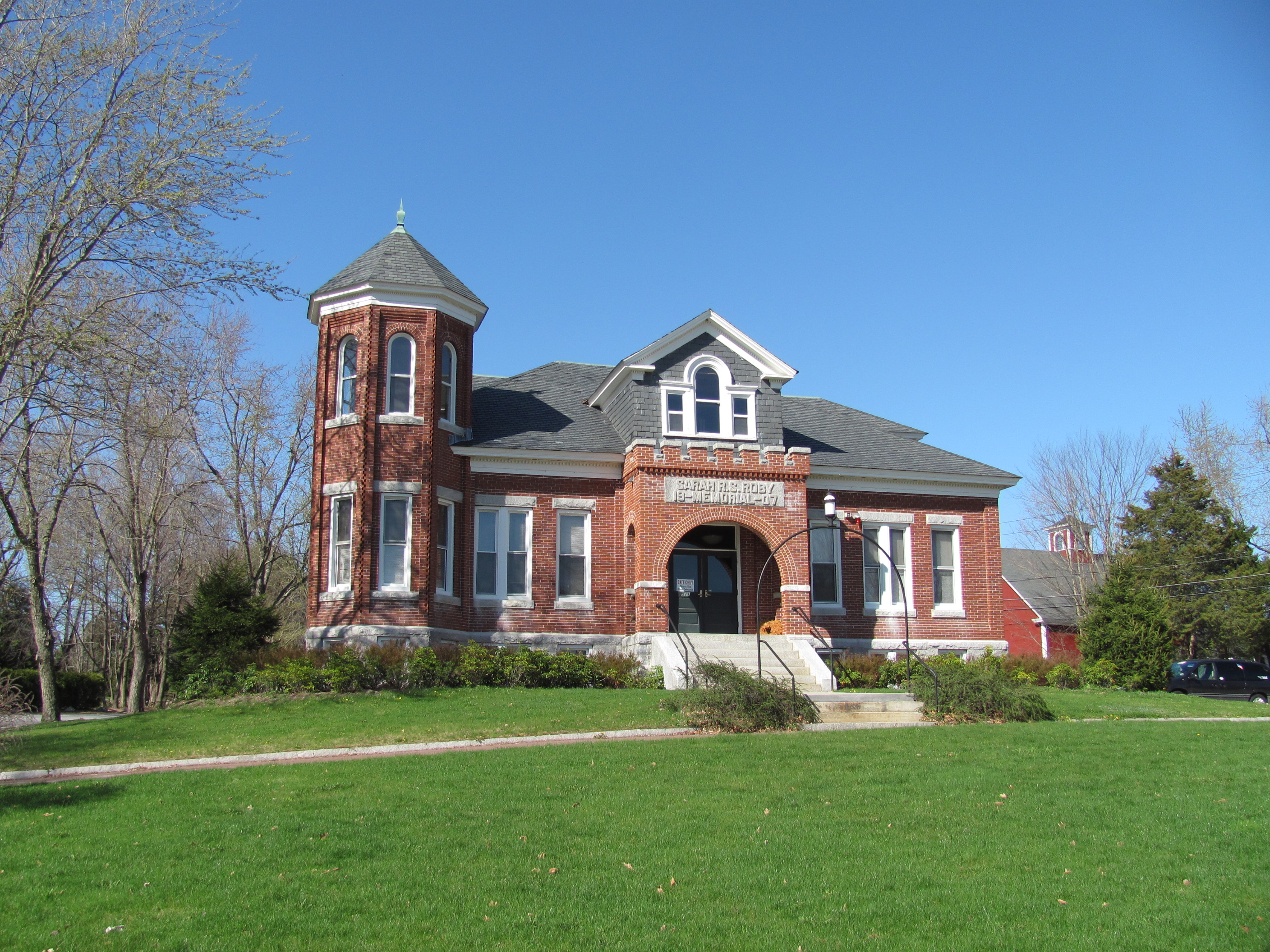

- Location within Massachusetts Location within the United States
- Location: Dunstable, Massachusetts
- Coordinates: 42°40′35″N 71°29′10″W
- Area: 1.72 acres (0.70 ha)
- Architect: Warren L. Floyd
- Architectural style: Queen Anne, Romanesque
- NRHP reference No.: 99000557
- Added to NRHP: May 12, 1999

Dunstable Town Hall is a historic town hall at 511 Main Street in Dunstable, Massachusetts, United States. The architecturally eclectic 1 1/2-story brick-and-stone building was built in 1907–1908 to a design by Warren L. Floyd, a Lowell architect. It was a gift to the town by Sarah R. S. Roby, in whose honor the building is named.

The building exhibits a diversity of styles, with elements of Richardsonian Romanesque, Queen Anne, and Classical Revival styling present. When built, the building housed all town offices, including the police station and a small lockup, as well as the public library. The library moved to new quarters in 1998; the building continues to be a focal point of civic life in the town.

Warren Lyman Floyd (February 1, 1836 – August 2, 1918), the architect, practiced in Lowell from 1875 until his retirement in 1909. His other work includes schools and churches in and around Lowell and the former First Baptist Church (1888) of Mount Vernon, New York.

The building was listed on the National Register of Historic Places in 1999.

== See also ==
- National Register of Historic Places listings in Middlesex County, Massachusetts
