= Bullard Farm =

- U.S. National Register of Historic Places
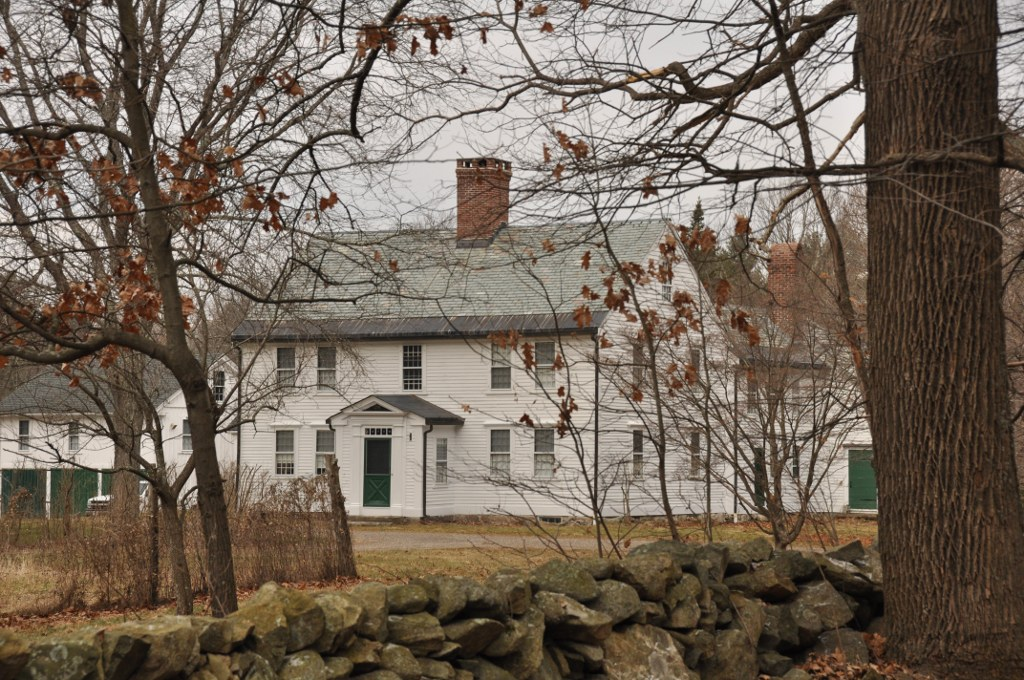

- Location within Massachusetts Location within the United States
- Location: Holliston, Massachusetts
- Coordinates: 42°11′44″N 71°23′17″W
- Built: 1777; addition 1794
- Architectural style: Georgian
- NRHP reference No.: 95000710
- Added to NRHP: May 26, 1995

The Bullard Memorial Farm is a historic farm located at 7 Bullard Lane in Holliston, Massachusetts. It was first settled by Benjamin Bullard in approximately 1652. The land was purchased from local Native Americans. Bullards farmed the land until 1916, when John Anson Bullard bequeathed it to the Bullard Memorial Farm Association (“BMFA”), which had been created in 1909. The main house was built in 1777 and enlarged in 1794; the property has a number of outbuildings, including a barn, a vinegar building, a cider building, a blacksmith shop, a library, a locker building, a small shed/horse barn, and a cottage. The farm includes 100 acres (40 ha) under a forestry and agricultural designation and another 50 acres (20 ha) are undeveloped pasture." The farm was listed on the National Register of Historic Places in 1995.

== See also ==
- National Register of Historic Places listings in Middlesex County, Massachusetts
