= Westlawn Cemetery (Westford, Massachusetts) =

Historic cemetery in Massachusetts, United States

- U.S. National Register of Historic Places
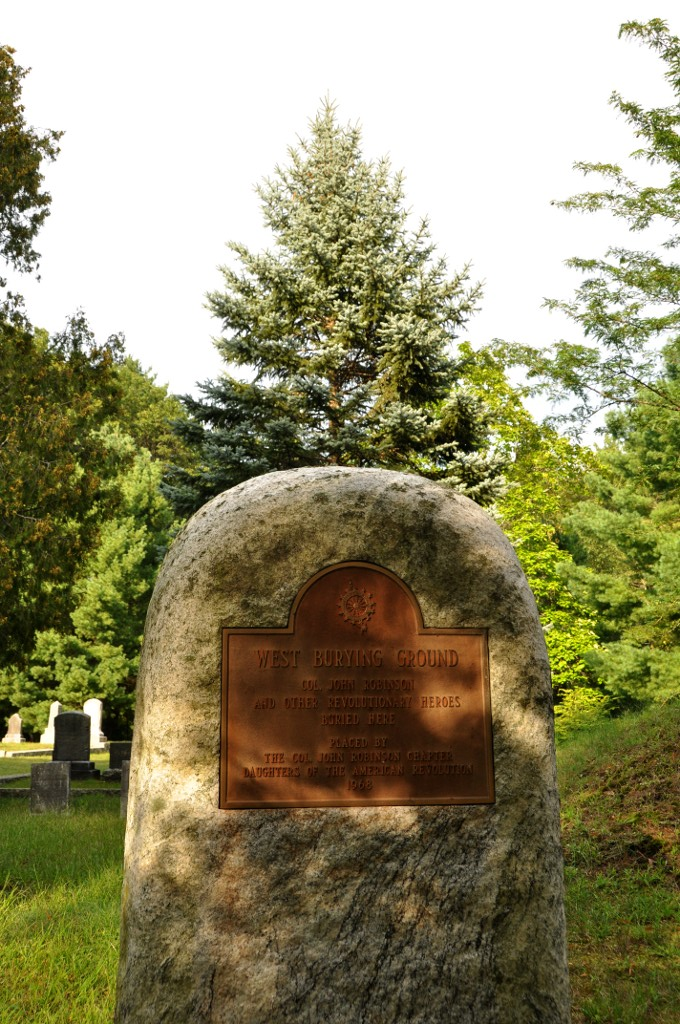

- Location within Massachusetts Location within the United States
- Location: Westford, Massachusetts
- Coordinates: 42°34′16″N 71°28′2″W
- Area: 1.7 acres (0.69 ha)
- Built: 1895
- NRHP reference No.: 04001433
- Added to NRHP: January 5, 2005

Westlawn Cemetery is a historic cemetery on Concord Road at Country Road in Westford, Massachusetts.

== History ==
Established in 1761 as the West Burying Ground, it is one of the town's oldest cemeteries. It occupies a roughly triangular plot of 1.7 acres (0.69 ha). There are approximately 400 marked burials, generally laid out in rows running east–west. One of its most prominent burials is that of Colonel John Robinson, who led Westford's minutemen in the 1775 Battles of Lexington and Concord.

The cemetery was listed on the National Register of Historic Places in 2005.

== See also ==
- National Register of Historic Places listings in Middlesex County, Massachusetts
