= Winslow School and Littlefield Library =

- U.S. National Register of Historic Places
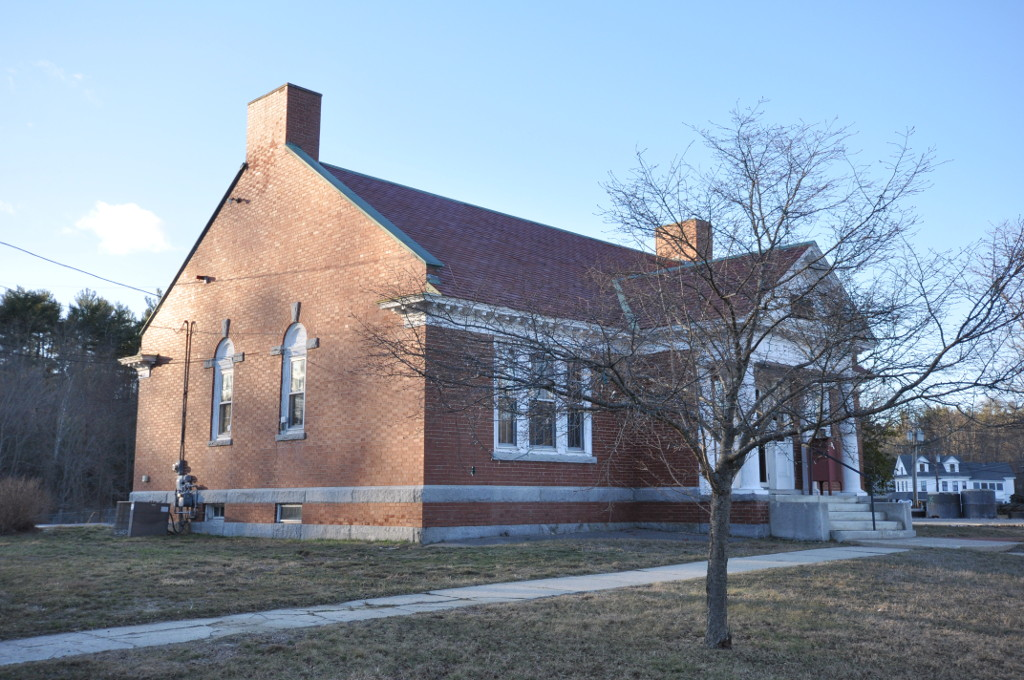

- Location within Massachusetts Location within the United States
- Location: 250 & 252 Middlesex Rd., Tyngsborough, Massachusetts
- Coordinates: 42°40′40″N 71°25′28″W
- Built: 1890; 1905
- Architectural style: Colonial Revival; Bungalow
- NRHP reference No.: 100000722
- Added to NRHP: March 7, 2017

The Winslow School and Littlefield Library are a pair of historic municipal buildings at 250 and 252 Middlesex Road in Tyngsborough, Massachusetts. Built in 1890 and 1904, both are architect-designed buildings of high quality, funded by local benefactors. The buildings were listed on the National Register of Historic Places in 1990.

== Description and history ==
The Winslow School and Littlefield Library occupy a shared lot on the north side of Tyngsborough's town center, on the west side of Middlesex Road just north of its junction with Winslow and Farwell Roads. The school is a 1 1/2-story wood-frame structure, covered by a hip roof and finished in wooden clapboards. Its central portion is flanked on both sides by single-story wings. Bands of windows flank the central entrance, which is sheltered by a gabled portico. The library stands just north of the school; it is a single-story brick building of smaller scale, with a gabled roof and gabled entrance portico. It is the only brick building in the town center.

The school was built in 1890 with funding provided by Sara Tyng Winslow, two years after the town embarked on a consolidation of its district schools. Originally located nearer the Congregational church, it was designed by F.H. Bacon after a more expensive design by Frederick Stickney was rejected. The school was enlarged in 1915, at which time it was given a more Bungalow-style appearance, and was moved to its present site about 1940.

The library, founded in 1831, was at first housed in the town hall, and was placed in the Winslow School between 1893 and 1901. It then moved back to Town Hall, awaiting construction of the present building, which was completed in 1905 to a design by Stickney & Austin. Funds for the building, as well as an endowment for further acquisitions, were donated by Mrs. Lucy Littlefield on the stipulation that the library be named in honor of her daughter.

The school was closed in 2002, and the library was relocated to more modern facilities in the 1990s.

== See also ==
- National Register of Historic Places listings in Middlesex County, Massachusetts
