= Zeb Spaulding House =

Historic house in Massachusetts, United States

- U.S. National Register of Historic Places
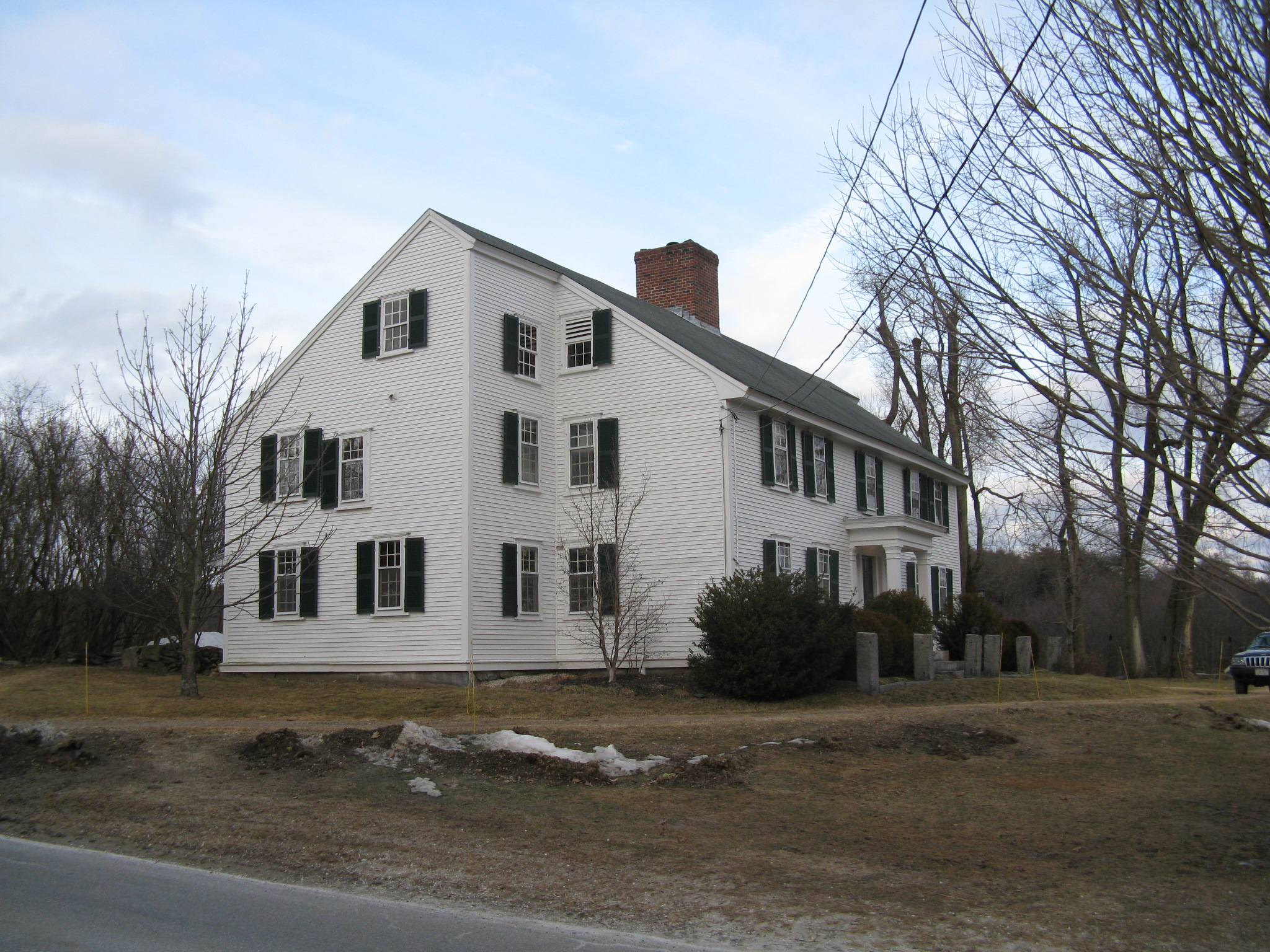
- Zeb Spaulding House

- Location within Massachusetts Location within the United States
- Location: 1044 Lowell Road, Carlisle, Massachusetts
- Coordinates: 42°33′25″N 71°21′13″W
- Area: 4.5 acres (1.8 ha)
- Architectural style: Colonial
- MPS: First Period Buildings of Eastern Massachusetts TR
- NRHP reference No.: 90000169
- Added to NRHP: March 9, 1990

The Zeb Spaulding House is a historic First Period house in Carlisle, Massachusetts, United States. It is a 2 1/2-story timber-frame structure, five bays wide, with a side gable roof, large central chimney, and clapboard siding. It was built c. 1725, with additions extending from its rear that date to the 18th and 19th centuries. Its interior beams have quirk beading, a late First Period feature, and there is a Federal period mantel around the fireplace in the right side parlor.

The house was added to the National Register of Historic Places in 1990.

== See also ==
- National Register of Historic Places listings in Middlesex County, Massachusetts
