= Charles A. Daniels School =

- U.S. National Register of Historic Places
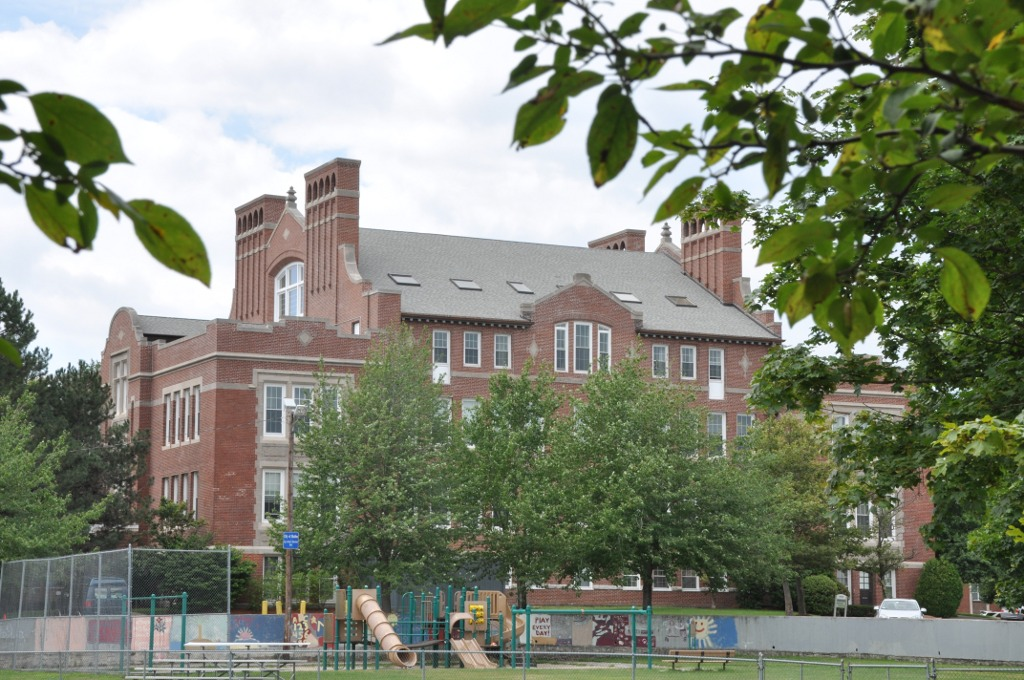

- Location within Massachusetts Location within the United States
- Location: Malden, Massachusetts
- Coordinates: 42°25′44″N 71°3′13″W
- Area: 5.5 acres (2.2 ha)
- Built: 1907
- Architect: Brainerd & Leeds
- Architectural style: Tudor Revival
- NRHP reference No.: 86003562
- Added to NRHP: January 6, 1987

The Charles A. Daniels School is a historic school building on Daniels Street in Malden, Massachusetts. The Tudor Revival style brick building was constructed in 1907 to a design by Warren Hutchins. The building has a large central block that is three stories high, with a gabled roof, and flanking flat-roofed wings of two stories that project from the main facade. It has a particularly ornate limestone entrance portico.

The building was listed on the National Register of Historic Places in 1987. It now contains apartments.

== See also ==
- National Register of Historic Places listings in Middlesex County, Massachusetts
