= John Bickford House =

Historic house in Massachusetts, United States

- U.S. National Register of Historic Places
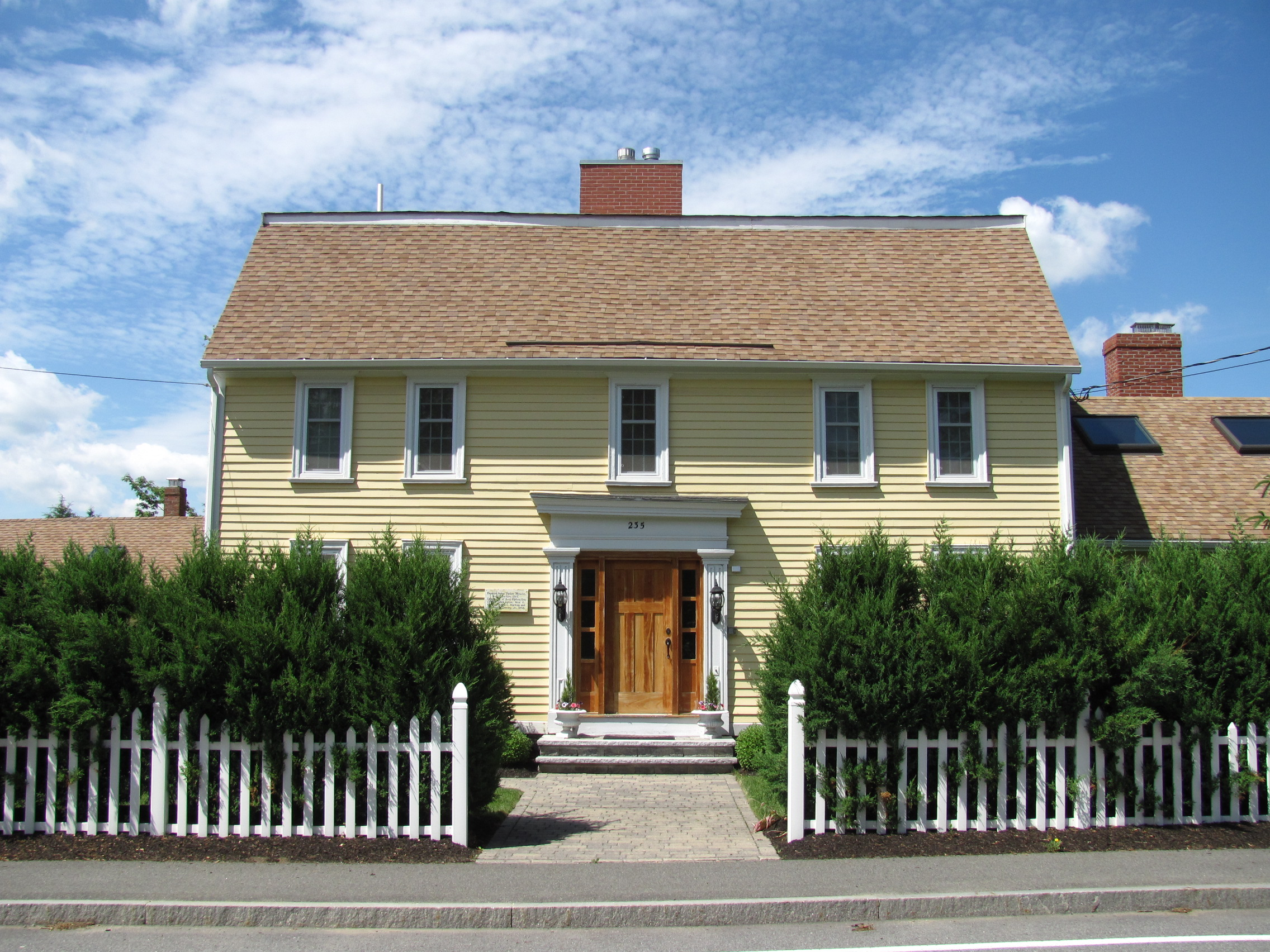
- John Bickford House

- Location within Massachusetts Location within the United States
- Location: 235 Elm Street, North Reading, Massachusetts
- Coordinates: 42°34′38″N 71°4′2″W
- Built: 1735
- Architectural style: Colonial
- MPS: First Period Buildings of Eastern Massachusetts TR
- NRHP reference No.: 90000177
- Added to NRHP: March 9, 1990

The John Bickford House is a historic late First Period house in North Reading, Massachusetts. The c. 1735 two-story timber-frame house has relatively conservative First Period features despite its somewhat (comparatively) late construction date, which may be due to John Bickford's strong connections with nearby Salem. Its timber frame and central chimney are conservative in design, but the building also has Georgian paneling on the interior, and, unusual for the period, a gambrel-style roof.

The house was added to the National Register of Historic Places in 1990.

== See also ==
- National Register of Historic Places listings in Middlesex County, Massachusetts
