= Marcia Browne Junior High School =

- U.S. National Register of Historic Places
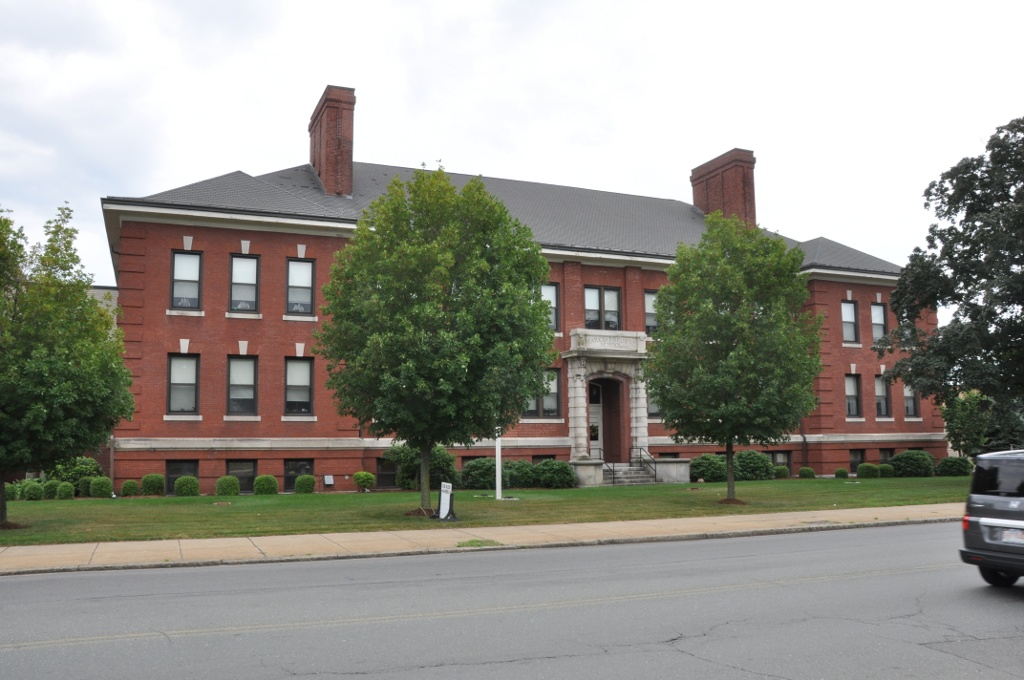

- Location within Massachusetts Location within the United States
- Location: Malden, Massachusetts
- Coordinates: 42°25′58″N 71°02′19″W
- Area: 2.58 acres (1.04 ha)
- Architect: Edward I. Wilson
- Architectural style: Colonial Revival
- NRHP reference No.: 00001273
- Added to NRHP: November 2, 2000

The Marcia Browne Junior High School, also known as the Broadway School, is a historic school building at 295 Broadway in Malden, Massachusetts. The brick Colonial Revival two story building was constructed in 1905 to a design by Boston architect Edward I. Wilson, and expanded in 1925. The original portion of the building consists of a central rectangular block, which is flanked by matching wings which project slightly from the main (western) facade. The 1925 additions consist of a rear classroom ell and an auditorium/gymnasium addition connected to the north end of the main building by a hyphen. Originally known as the Broadway School, it was renamed in 1913 in honor of a well-liked principal. It served as a junior high school until the early 1990s, when it was closed.

The building was listed on the National Register of Historic Places in 2000. It is now home to an elderly assisted living facility.

== See also ==
- National Register of Historic Places listings in Middlesex County, Massachusetts
