= Old Billerica Road Historic District =

Historic district in Massachusetts, United States

- U.S. National Register of Historic Places
- U.S. Historic district
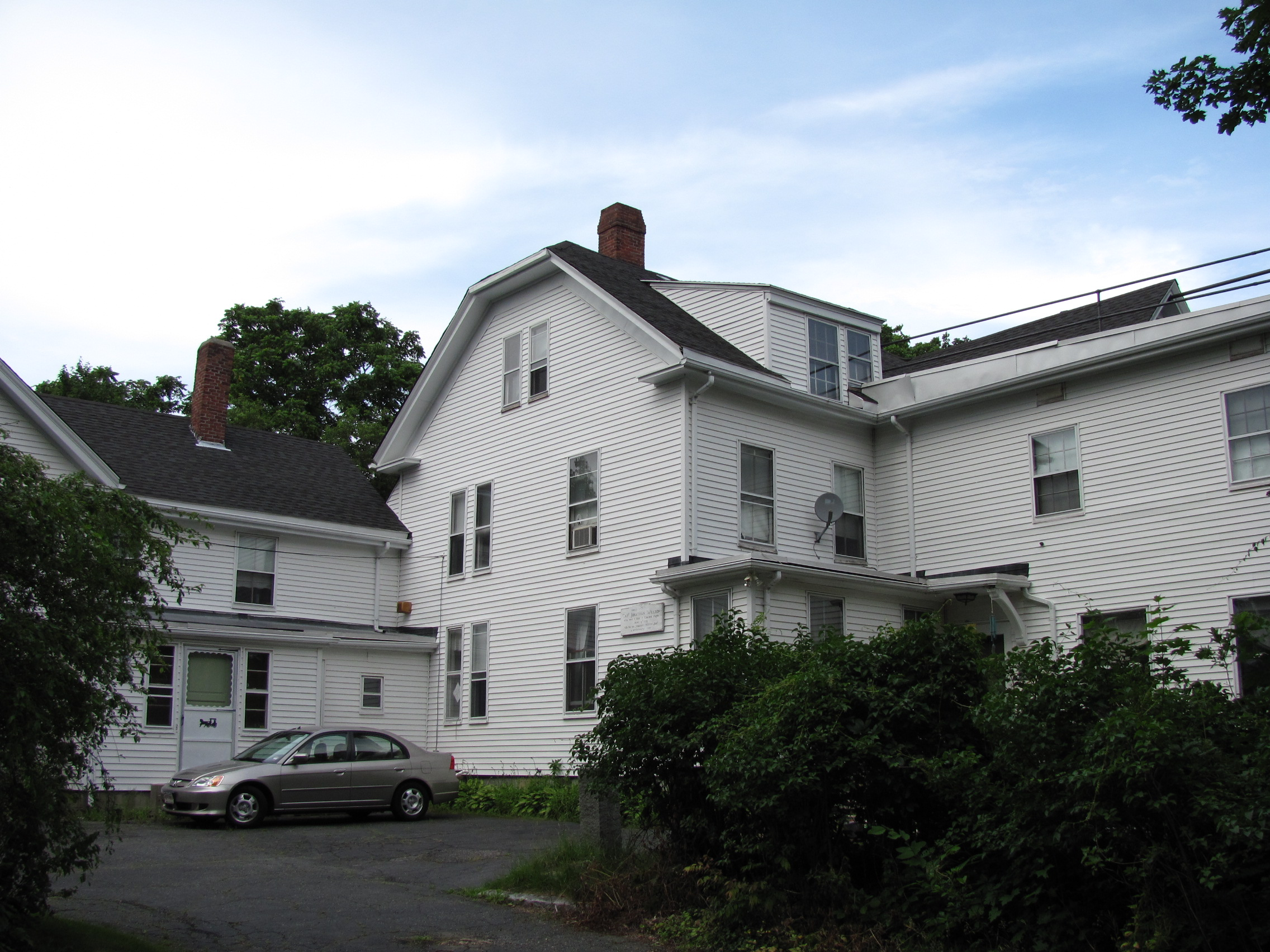
- Capt. Jonathan Wilson House

- Location within Massachusetts Location within the United States
- Location: Bedford, Massachusetts
- Coordinates: 42°30′45.6726″N 71°15′28.227″W
- Area: 67 acres (27 ha)
- Architectural style: Georgian, Federal
- NRHP reference No.: 07000681
- Added to NRHP: July 11, 2007

The Old Billerica Road Historic District encompasses a rural residential stretch of Old Billerica Road in Bedford, Massachusetts. It is bounded on the north by Eli-Wil Farm Road, and on the south by Mitchell Grant Lane, and includes houses numbered 229-301 Old Billerica Road. The area represents a cross-section of residential housing in Bedford, encompassing its agrarian origins and its development through the 19th century to a suburban community in the 20th. The district also has a well-preserved series of fieldstone walls, lining both the roads and some of the property boundaries.

The district was listed on the National Register of Historic Places in 2007.

== See also ==
- National Register of Historic Places listings in Middlesex County, Massachusetts
