= National Register of Historic Places listings in Middlesex County, Massachusetts =

Location of Middlesex County in Massachusetts

This is a listing of places in Middlesex County in the U.S. state of Massachusetts that are listed in the National Register of Historic Places. With more than 1,300 listings, the county has more listings than any other county in the United States.

Contents: Counties in Massachusetts

Barnstable | Berkshire | Bristol | Dukes | Essex | Franklin | Hampden | Hampshire | Middlesex | Nantucket | Norfolk | Plymouth | Suffolk | Worcester

This National Park Service list is complete through NPS recent listings posted November 6, 2026.

== Cities and towns listed separately ==
The following Middlesex County cities and towns have large numbers of sites listed in the National Register of Historic Places. Lists of their sites are on separate pages, linked below.

Community	Image	First Date listed	Last Date listed	Count
Arlington		October 7, 1971	January 18, 2006	64
Cambridge		October 15, 1966	August 22, 2023	207
Concord		October 15, 1966	September 12, 2007	27
Framingham		January 17, 1975	November 2, 2023	20
Lexington		October 16, 1966	January 19, 2016	17
Lowell		August 21, 1972	March 11, 2011	41
Marlborough		May 9, 1980	November 9, 2008	17
Medford		October 15, 1966	November 19, 2009	36
Newton		June 4, 1973	December 18, 2009	188
Reading		August 19, 1975	May 30, 1997	89
Sherborn		January 3, 1986	March 9, 1990	24
Somerville		May 21, 1975	November 19, 2009	84
Stoneham		April 13, 1984	May 26, 2005	69
Wakefield		October 19, 1987	April 15, 2014	95
Waltham		December 30, 1970	January 18, 2006	109
Weston		September 28, 1972	September 6, 2006	15
Winchester		March 2, 1979	November 19, 2009	68

== Other municipalities ==
	Name on the Register	Image	Date listed	Location	City or town	Description
1	1767 Milestones	1767 Milestones	April 7, 1971 (#71000084)	Between Boston and Springfield along Old Post Rd. 42°21′36″N 71°25′30″W	Sudbury, Cambridge, Wayland	Includes locations in Suffolk, Norfolk, Worcester, and Hampden counties.
2	1790 House	1790 House	October 9, 1974 (#74000381)	827 Main St. 42°30′11″N 71°09′40″W	Woburn	
3	Acton Centre Historic District	Acton Centre Historic District	March 10, 1983 (#83000780)	Main St., Wood and Woodbur Lanes, Newtown, Concord, and Nagog Hill Rds. 42°29′11″N 71°25′58″W	Acton	
4	Acton High School	Acton High School	November 22, 2011 (#11000854)	3 Charter Rd. 42°28′32″N 71°27′20″W	Acton	1925 Renaissance Revival-style school building designed by Boston architect John H. Bickford
5	Ashland Dam and Spillway	Ashland Dam and Spillway	January 18, 1990 (#89002289)	Northern end of the Ashland Reservoir in Ashland State Park; 42°14′46″N 71°27′37″W	Ashland	
6	Ashland Town House	Ashland Town House	March 3, 2004 (#04000120)	101 Main St. 42°15′40″N 71°27′58″W	Ashland	
7	Ayer Main Street Historic District	Ayer Main Street Historic District	March 16, 1989 (#88000193)	Main St. roughly between Park and Columbia Sts. 42°33′34″N 71°35′20″W	Ayer	
8	Stephen Bacon House	Stephen Bacon House	March 9, 1990 (#90000174)	105 N. Main St. 42°17′30″N 71°21′24″W	Natick	
9	Bacon-Gleason-Blodgett Homestead	Bacon-Gleason-Blodgett Homestead	April 14, 1977 (#77000166)	118 Wilson Rd. 42°30′01″N 71°14′51″W	Bedford	
10	Rev. Stephen Badger House	Rev. Stephen Badger House	April 1, 1980 (#80000647)	87 Eliot St. 42°16′11″N 71°19′07″W	Natick	
11	Loammi Baldwin Mansion	Loammi Baldwin Mansion	October 7, 1971 (#71000090)	2 Alfred St. 42°30′08″N 71°09′29″W	Woburn	Home of Col. Loammi Baldwin, engineer of the Middlesex Canal, which the mansion overlooks
12	Bancroft School		November 2, 2026 (#100013572)	12 Bancroft Street; 42°25′43″N 71°27′06″W	Maynard	
13	Bedford Center Historic District	Bedford Center Historic District	November 17, 1977 (#77000165)	Irregular pattern along Great Rd. from Bacon to Concord and North Rds.; also roughly the Great Rd. from Bacon Rd., Memorial Park, and Narrow Gauge Trail on the east to North and Concord Rds. on the west 42°29′33″N 71°16′52″W	Bedford	Second set of boundaries represents a boundary increase of June 13, 2014
14	Bedford Depot	Bedford Depot	August 21, 2003 (#03000791)	80 Loomis St. and 120 South Rd. 42°29′09″N 71°16′34″W	Bedford	
15	Bedford Veterans Administration Hospital District	Bedford Veterans Administration Hospital District	November 28, 2012 (#12000977)	200 Springs Rd. 42°30′19″N 71°16′15″W	Bedford	
16	Beebe Estate	Beebe Estate	May 20, 1981 (#81000116)	235 W. Foster St. 42°27′20″N 71°04′13″W	Melrose	
17	Bell Rock Memorial Park	Bell Rock Memorial Park	February 9, 2001 (#01000086)	Bounded by Main, Wigglesworth, Meridan, and Ellis Sts. 42°25′13″N 71°04′04″W	Malden	
18	Belmont Railroad Station	Belmont Railroad Station	December 4, 1998 (#98001443)	1 Common St. 42°23′45″N 71°10′36″W	Belmont	
19	Bennett-Shattuck House	Bennett-Shattuck House	February 22, 2006 (#06000061)	653 Martins Pond Rd. 42°37′22″N 71°32′05″W	Groton	
20	John Bickford House	John Bickford House	March 9, 1990 (#90000177)	235 Elm St. 42°34′38″N 71°04′02″W	North Reading	
21	Billerica Mills Historic District	Billerica Mills Historic District	November 10, 1983 (#83003996)	Roughly bounded by Concord River, Treble Cove Terr., Kohlrausch Ave., Indian Rd., Holt Ruggles, and Rogers Sts. 42°35′23″N 71°17′06″W	Billerica	
22	Billerica Town Common District	Billerica Town Common District	August 14, 1973 (#73000280)	Bounded by Cummings St., Concord Rd., and Boston Rd. 42°33′22″N 71°16′11″W	Billerica	
23	Bogle-Walker House	Bogle-Walker House	August 27, 1992 (#92001044)	55 and 62 Goodman's Rd. 42°21′54″N 71°24′06″W	Sudbury	Dismantled in 2006
24	Boutell-Hathorn House	Boutell-Hathorn House	October 27, 2004 (#04001210)	280 Woburn St. 42°33′54″N 71°08′47″W	Wilmington	
25	Gov. George S. Boutwell House	Gov. George S. Boutwell House	January 5, 2005 (#04001431)	172 Main St. 42°36′29″N 71°34′17″W	Groton	
26	Boxborough Old Town Center	Boxborough Old Town Center	December 12, 2006 (#06001122)	Hill Rd., Middle Rd., Picnic St. 42°29′46″N 71°31′37″W	Boxborough	
27	Moses Brewer House	Moses Brewer House	March 9, 1990 (#90000184)	88 Concord Rd. 42°22′03″N 71°24′52″W	Sudbury	
28	Daniel Brooks House	Daniel Brooks House	October 25, 1973 (#73000293)	Brooks Rd. E. 42°26′50″N 71°18′35″W	Lincoln	
29	Brookside Historic District	Brookside Historic District	January 23, 2003 (#02001729)	1–44 Brookside, 5 Moore Rd., 1–7 Coolidge Ave. 42°36′36″N 71°24′42″W	Westford	
30	Brown-Stow House	Brown-Stow House	March 9, 1990 (#90000182)	172 Harvard Rd. 42°26′24″N 71°32′12″W	Stow	
31	Abraham Browne House	Abraham Browne House	March 9, 1990 (#90000186)	562 Main St. 42°22′20″N 71°12′03″W	Watertown	
32	Browne-Masonic Building	Browne-Masonic Building	March 22, 2022 (#100007522)	126-150 Pleasant St. 42°25′38″N 71°04′15″W	Malden	
33	Buck's Corner Historic District	Buck's Corner Historic District	November 21, 2003 (#03001209)	216 Wildwood St., 580,584,588,590,602,603,604 Woburn St. 42°32′52″N 71°09′05″W	Wilmington	
34	Ephraim Buck House	Ephraim Buck House	March 9, 1990 (#90000189)	216 Wildwood St. 42°32′49″N 71°09′06″W	Wilmington	
35	Bullard Farm	Bullard Farm	May 26, 1995 (#95000710)	7 Bullard Ln. 42°11′44″N 71°23′17″W	Holliston	
36	Isaac Bullard House	Isaac Bullard House	March 9, 1990 (#90000171)	77 Ashland St. 42°13′42″N 71°26′08″W	Holliston	
37	Butters-Avery House	Butters-Avery House	July 3, 2010 (#10000413)	165 Chestnut St. 42°31′57″N 71°10′34″W	Wilmington	
38	Casey's Diner	Casey's Diner	September 22, 1999 (#99001122)	36 South Ave. 42°17′08″N 71°20′43″W	Natick	
39	Cedar Swamp Archeological District	Cedar Swamp Archeological District	May 23, 1988 (#88000587)	Along the border with Westborough in Worcester County; 42°15′36″N 71°35′06″W	Hopkinton	Extends into Westborough in Worcester County
40	Center School	Center School	June 21, 2006 (#06000523)	13 Bedford St. 42°30′17″N 71°11′46″W	Burlington	
41	Charles River Reservation Parkways	Charles River Reservation Parkways	January 18, 2006 (#05001530)	Soldiers Field, Nonantum, Leo Birmingham, Arsenal, Greenough, N. Beacon, Charles River, Norumbega, Recreation; 42°21′42″N 71°09′31″W	Watertown	Extends into Cambridge, Newton, Waltham, and Weston in Middlesex County and into Boston in Suffolk County
42	Chelmsford Center Historic District	Chelmsford Center Historic District	February 20, 1980 (#80000646)	MA 4, MA 110 and MA 27; 42°35′53″N 71°21′15″W	Chelmsford	
43	Church Street Historic District	Church Street Historic District	November 21, 2003 (#03001175)	72–150 and 117–135 Church St., 4 Central St. 42°33′09″N 71°10′07″W	Wilmington	
44	Clark Houses	Clark Houses	February 17, 1978 (#78000453)	74 and 76 W. Central St. 42°16′56″N 71°21′25″W	Natick	
45	Commanding Officer's Quarters, Watertown Arsenal	Commanding Officer's Quarters, Watertown Arsenal	October 7, 1976 (#76000279)	443 Arsenal St. 42°21′37″N 71°09′50″W	Watertown	
46	Common Burying Ground at Sandy Bank	Common Burying Ground at Sandy Bank	August 27, 1981 (#81000108)	Green St. 42°25′03″N 71°04′19″W	Malden	
47	Common Street Cemetery	Common Street Cemetery	February 3, 2022 (#100007387)	Common St. 42°22′06″N 71°10′42″W	Watertown	
48	Community Memorial Hospital	Community Memorial Hospital	May 14, 2004 (#04000423)	15 Winthrop Ave. 42°33′40″N 71°34′50″W	Ayer	
49	Converse Memorial Building	Converse Memorial Building	September 5, 1985 (#85002014)	36 Salem St. 42°25′39″N 71°03′59″W	Malden	National Historic Landmark
50	Coolidge School	Coolidge School	February 25, 2009 (#09000055)	319 Arlington St. 42°22′23″N 71°09′27″W	Watertown	
51	Charles A. Daniels School	Charles A. Daniels School	January 6, 1987 (#86003562)	Daniels St. 42°25′44″N 71°03′13″W	Malden	
52	Isaac Davis Trail	Isaac Davis Trail	April 11, 1972 (#72001347)	Running E-W between towns of Acton and Concord; 42°28′48″N 71°23′57″W	Acton	
53	District 7 School	District 7 School	January 29, 2008 (#07001487)	366 Chicopee Row; 42°37′54″N 71°32′54″W	Groton	Owned by the Groton Historical Society.
54	Dunstable Center Historic District	Dunstable Center Historic District	November 5, 2018 (#100003069)	High, Highland, Main, & Pleasant Sts. 42°40′28″N 71°28′56″W	Dunstable	
55	Dunstable Town Hall	Dunstable Town Hall	May 12, 1999 (#99000557)	511 Main St. 42°40′35″N 71°29′10″W	Dunstable	
56	Dutton–Holden Homestead	Dutton–Holden Homestead	March 29, 2001 (#01000307)	28 Pond St. 42°33′56″N 71°15′52″W	Billerica	
57	East Holliston Historic District	East Holliston Historic District	June 14, 2002 (#02000636)	Washington, Baker, Curve, Woodland St., Quail Run; 42°12′50″N 71°25′14″W	Holliston	
58	Exchange Hall	Exchange Hall	June 13, 1986 (#86001327)	Quimby Sq. on School St. 42°27′39″N 71°27′16″W	Acton	
59	Fairview Cemetery	Fairview Cemetery	January 12, 2005 (#04001472)	Main St. 42°35′13″N 71°25′15″W	Westford	
60	Farley-Hutchinson-Kimball House	Farley-Hutchinson-Kimball House	March 27, 2012 (#12000151)	461A & 463 North Rd. 42°31′26″N 71°17′07″W	Bedford	
61	Faulkner Homestead	Faulkner Homestead	December 16, 1971 (#71000080)	5 High St. 42°27′32″N 71°27′14″W	Acton	
62	Fells Connector Parkways, Metropolitan System of Greater Boston	Fells Connector Parkways, Metropolitan System of Greater Boston	May 9, 2003 (#03000379)	Fellsway East: E. Border Rd. to Fellsway W.; Fellsway West: Fulton St. to Fellway E.; Fellsway:Fellsway E. to the Wellington Bridge; 42°24′54″N 71°05′03″W	Malden and Medford	
63	Fellsmere Park Parkways, Metropolitan Park System of Greater Boston	Fellsmere Park Parkways, Metropolitan Park System of Greater Boston	May 9, 2003 (#03000381)	W. Border Rd, Boundary Rd. 42°25′41″N 71°05′12″W	Malden	
64	Felton Street School	Felton Street School	February 27, 1986 (#86000275)	20 Felton St. 42°23′33″N 71°34′12″W	Hudson	
65	First Burial Ground	First Burial Ground	November 13, 2004 (#04001222)	Park St. near Centre St. 42°28′54″N 71°09′11″W	Woburn	
66	First Congregational Church in Woburn	First Congregational Church in Woburn	January 6, 1992 (#91001898)	322 Main St. 42°28′43″N 71°09′09″W	Woburn	
67	First Parish Church of Groton	First Parish Church of Groton	March 16, 2021 (#100005275)	1 Powderhouse Rd. 42°36′20″N 71°34′02″W	Groton	
68	Fiske House	Fiske House	December 9, 1977 (#77000171)	1 Billerica Rd. 42°35′47″N 71°21′06″W	Chelmsford Center	
69	Henry Fletcher House	Henry Fletcher House	September 30, 1993 (#93000010)	224 Concord Rd. 42°33′04″N 71°25′39″W	Westford	
70	Flint House	Flint House	July 25, 2003 (#03000684)	28 Lexington Rd. 42°25′44″N 71°17′46″W	Lincoln	
71	Forge Village Historic District	Forge Village Historic District	May 2, 2002 (#02000430)	Roughly bounded by Forge Pond, W. Prescott St., Story St., Orchard St., Abbott St., and Pleasant St. 42°34′51″N 71°28′58″W	Westford	
72	Fort Devens Historic District	Fort Devens Historic District	June 10, 1993 (#93000437)	Roughly bounded by El Caney St., Antietam St., Sherman Ave., MacArthur Ave. and Buena Vista St. 42°32′46″N 71°36′46″W	Ayer	Extends into Harvard in Worcester County.
73	Edmund Fowle House	Edmund Fowle House	November 11, 1977 (#77000189)	26–28 Marshall St. 42°22′06″N 71°10′51″W	Watertown	
74	Glenwood Cemetery	Glenwood Cemetery	May 12, 2004 (#04000425)	Northeast of Parker St. and Great Rd. 42°25′28″N 71°26′54″W	Maynard	
75	Goodale Homestead	Goodale Homestead	January 21, 1975 (#75000260)	100 Chestnut St. 42°22′46″N 71°30′14″W	Hudson	
76	Goodnow Library	Goodnow Library	May 22, 2002 (#02000549)	21 Concord Rd. 42°21′47″N 71°25′02″W	Sudbury	
77	Gowing-Sheldon Historic District	Gowing-Sheldon Historic District	November 21, 2003 (#03001176)	642 and 643 Woburn St. 42°32′30″N 71°09′01″W	Wilmington	
78	The Grange	The Grange	April 18, 1974 (#74000373)	Codman Rd. 42°25′02″N 71°19′52″W	Lincoln	Boundary increase (added 1976-05-28): Codman Rd.
79	Graniteville Historic District	Graniteville Historic District	January 17, 2002 (#01001467)	Broadway, Church, Cross, First, Fourth, N. Main, River School, Second, and Third Sts. 42°35′42″N 71°28′12″W	Westford	
80	Gropius House	Gropius House	May 16, 2000 (#00000709)	68 Baker Bridge Rd. 42°25′37″N 71°19′37″W	Lincoln	National Historic Landmark
81	Groton High School	Groton High School	March 2, 2010 (#10000057)	145 Main St. 42°36′26″N 71°34′11″W	Groton	
82	Groton Inn	Groton Inn	August 3, 1976 (#76000241)	Main St. 42°36′24″N 71°34′07″W	Groton	Destroyed in a 2011 fire.
83	Groton Leatherboard Company	Groton Leatherboard Company	April 18, 2002 (#02000378)	6 W. Main St. 42°36′08″N 71°37′39″W	Groton	Now a senior living facility.
84	Hapgood House	Hapgood House	March 9, 1990 (#90000180)	76 Treaty Elm Ln. 42°25′14″N 71°30′35″W	Stow	
85	Harnden Tavern	Harnden Tavern	April 8, 1975 (#75000293)	430 Salem St. 42°34′46″N 71°08′52″W	Wilmington	Currently houses the Wilmington Town Museum.
86	Wilbur Fiske Haven House	Wilbur Fiske Haven House	December 17, 1992 (#92001659)	339 Pleasant St. 42°25′40″N 71°04′35″W	Malden	
87	Henry Higginson House	Henry Higginson House	May 26, 2005 (#05000468)	44 Baker Farm Rd. 42°26′03″N 71°19′42″W	Lincoln	
88	High Street Historic District	High Street Historic District	November 21, 2003 (#03001177)	Even nos. 8–72 High St. except 20A and 20R, plus nos. 31, 47, 57 and 67. 42°34′21″N 71°09′11″W	Wilmington	
89	Hildreth-Robbins House	Hildreth-Robbins House	November 29, 2006 (#06001090)	19 Maple Rd. 42°34′18″N 71°22′48″W	Chelmsford	
90	Abraham Hill House	Abraham Hill House	March 9, 1990 (#90000164)	388 Pleasant St. 42°24′10″N 71°10′06″W	Belmont	
91	Deacon Samuel Hill House	Deacon Samuel Hill House	March 9, 1990 (#90000165)	33 Riverhurst Rd. 42°32′10″N 71°18′12″W	Billerica	
92	Hillside Cemetery	Hillside Cemetery	December 6, 2005 (#05001373)	Depot and Nutting Rds. 42°36′26″N 71°26′40″W	Westford	
93	Hoar Tavern	Hoar Tavern	July 23, 1973 (#73000301)	Northeast of Lincoln on MA 2; 42°26′08″N 71°16′36″W	Lincoln	
94	Thomas Hollis Historic District	Thomas Hollis Historic District	October 30, 1989 (#89001786)	Washington St. from Winter to Highland Sts. 42°11′42″N 71°26′00″W	Holliston	
95	Hopestill Bent Tavern	Hopestill Bent Tavern	March 9, 1990 (#90000188)	252 Old Connecticut Path; 42°20′30″N 71°22′14″W	Wayland	
96	Hopkinton Dam and Spillway	Hopkinton Dam and Spillway	January 18, 1990 (#89002288)	Eastern end of Hopkinton Reservoir in Hopkinton State Park; 42°15′25″N 71°30′40″W	Ashland	
97	Hopkinton Supply Co. Building	Hopkinton Supply Co. Building	March 10, 1983 (#83000810)	26–28 Main St. 42°13′43″N 71°31′16″W	Hopkinton	
98	Jonathan and Simon Hosmer House	Jonathan and Simon Hosmer House	May 2, 2002 (#02000432)	300 Main St. 42°28′36″N 71°27′04″W	Acton	
99	Houghton Memorial Building	Houghton Memorial Building	March 18, 1991 (#91000242)	4 Rogers St. 42°32′20″N 71°29′03″W	Littleton	
100	Howe School	Howe School	June 11, 2002 (#02000634)	390 Boston Rd. 42°33′43″N 71°16′11″W	Billerica	
101	Oliver Hutchins House	Oliver Hutchins House	September 5, 1985 (#85002013)	79 Elm St. 42°33′25″N 71°22′52″W	Chelmsford	
102	Hydrant No. 3 House	Hydrant No. 3 House	March 6, 2000 (#00000113)	Washington St. 42°11′00″N 71°26′41″W	Holliston	Known locally as the Metcalf Pump House.
103	Jack's Diner	Jack's Diner	November 22, 2000 (#00001340)	901 Main St. 42°30′31″N 71°09′39″W	Woburn	Houses a Thai restaurant in 2011.
104	Robert Jenison House	Robert Jenison House	September 6, 1978 (#78000456)	1 Frost Road; 42°19′21″N 71°20′09″W	Natick	
105	John Eliot Historic District	John Eliot Historic District	June 23, 1983 (#83000812)	Eliot, Pleasant, and Auburn Sts. 42°16′20″N 71°18′56″W	Natick	
106	Jones Tavern	Jones Tavern	June 13, 1986 (#86001333)	128 Main St. 42°27′38″N 71°27′21″W	Acton	
107	Colonel Timothy Jones House	Colonel Timothy Jones House	September 9, 2021 (#100006594)	231 Concord Rd. 42°29′03″N 71°17′57″W	Bedford	
108	Jonathon Keyes Sr. House	Jonathon Keyes Sr. House	December 3, 2019 (#100004051)	16 Frances Hill Rd. 42°36′10″N 71°24′17″W	Westford	
109	David Lane House	David Lane House	April 2, 1980 (#80000644)	137 North Rd. 42°30′08″N 71°17′05″W	Bedford	House built in 1781
110	Job Lane House	Job Lane House	May 8, 1973 (#73000278)	295 North St. 42°30′46″N 71°17′04″W	Bedford	
111	Larrabee's Brick Block	Larrabee's Brick Block	March 29, 1984 (#84002729)	500–504 Main St. 42°27′20″N 71°03′57″W	Melrose	
112	Lincoln Center Historic District	Lincoln Center Historic District	July 18, 1985 (#85001604)	Bedford, Lincoln, Old Lexington, Sandy Pond, Trapelo, and Weston Rds. 42°25′32″N 71°18′56″W	Lincoln	
113	Lynn Fells Parkway, Metropolitan Park System of Greater Boston	Lynn Fells Parkway, Metropolitan Park System of Greater Boston	May 9, 2003 (#03000380)	Lynn Fells Parkway; 42°28′05″N 71°02′58″W	Melrose	Extends into Saugus, Essex County.
114	Malden City Infirmary	Malden City Infirmary	August 27, 2020 (#100005476)	341 Forest St. 42°26′28″N 71°03′20″W	Malden	Now a senior living center.
115	Manning Manse	Manning Manse	August 11, 1982 (#82001912)	56 Chelmsford Rd. 42°35′03″N 71°18′07″W	Billerica	
116	Marcia Browne Junior High School	Marcia Browne Junior High School	November 2, 2000 (#00001273)	295 Broadway; 42°25′59″N 71°02′22″W	Malden	
117	McCune Site	McCune Site	January 23, 1986 (#86000115)	Address Restricted	Lincoln	A prehistoric archaeological site
118	McLean Hospital National Register District	McLean Hospital National Register District	January 23, 2003 (#02001733)	115 Mill St. 42°23′35″N 71°11′29″W	Belmont	
119	Meeting House of the Second Parish in Woburn	Meeting House of the Second Parish in Woburn	March 9, 1990 (#90000167)	12 Lexington St. 42°30′26″N 71°04′39″W	Burlington	
120	Melrose Public Library	Melrose Public Library	June 23, 1988 (#88000909)	63 W. Emerson St. 42°27′33″N 71°04′02″W	Melrose	
121	Melrose Town Center Historic District	Melrose Town Center Historic District	April 1, 1982 (#82002744)	Main St. 42°27′26″N 71°03′52″W	Melrose	Includes town hall, fire station, Coolidge School, and two churches.
122	Metropolitan State Hospital	Metropolitan State Hospital	January 21, 1994 (#93001482)	475 Trapelo Rd. 42°24′14″N 71°12′40″W	Belmont	Extends into Waltham and Lexington
123	Middlesex Canal	Middlesex Canal	August 21, 1972 (#72000117)	Running southeast between the towns of Lowell and Medford; 42°33′40″N 71°14′09″W	Billerica, Chelmsford, Lowell, Wilmington, and Woburn	This listing encompasses only surviving canal fragments between Lowell and Woburn.
124	Middlesex Canal Historic and Archaeological District	Middlesex Canal Historic and Archaeological District	November 19, 2009 (#09000936)	Numerous locations along the historic route of the Middlesex Canal	Billerica, Chelmsford, Lowell, Medford, Somerville, Wilmington, Winchester, and Woburn	Extends into northern Boston; this listing encompasses the entire historic route of the canal.
125	Middlesex Fells Reservation Parkways	Middlesex Fells Reservation Parkways	February 4, 2003 (#02001749)	E. Border Rd., Fellsway E., Fellsway W., Hillcrest Parkway, South St., Pond St., S. Border Rd., Ravine Rd., and Woodland Rd. 42°26′43″N 71°06′10″W	Malden, Melrose, Medford, Stoneham, and Winchester	
126	Col. Adelbert Mossman House	Col. Adelbert Mossman House	September 30, 1982 (#82001904)	76 Park St. 42°23′08″N 71°34′30″W	Hudson	
127	Natick Center Historic District	Natick Center Historic District	December 16, 1977 (#77000186)	North Ave., Main, Central, and Summer Sts. 42°17′04″N 71°20′53″W	Natick	
128	North Acton Cemetery	North Acton Cemetery	August 15, 2019 (#100004269)	Carlisle Rd. & North St. 42°31′25″N 71°24′01″W	Acton	
129	North Town Hall	North Town Hall	October 13, 2015 (#15000732)	31 Princeton St. 42°38′15″N 71°22′54″W	Chelmsford	
130	Noyes-Parris House	Noyes-Parris House	March 9, 1990 (#90000187)	196 Old Connecticut Path; 42°20′56″N 71°21′43″W	Wayland	
131	Odd Fellows Building	Odd Fellows Building	December 22, 1988 (#87002564)	442 Main St. 42°25′37″N 71°04′04″W	Malden	
132	Old Billerica Road Historic District	Old Billerica Road Historic District	July 11, 2007 (#07000681)	229–301 Old Billerica Rd. 42°28′53″N 71°05′48″W	Bedford	
133	Old Burying Ground	Old Burying Ground	February 5, 2002 (#01001560)	King St. near its junction with White St. 42°32′43″N 71°28′44″W	Littleton	
134	Old Burying Ground	Old Burying Ground	February 3, 2022 (#100007388)	Grove St. 42°22′17″N 71°09′21″W	Watertown	
135	Old Chelmsford Garrison House Complex	Old Chelmsford Garrison House Complex	May 8, 1973 (#73000289)	105 Garrison Rd. 42°34′42″N 71°23′30″W	Chelmsford	
136	Old Town Bridge	Old Town Bridge	May 2, 1975 (#75000292)	North of Wayland on MA 27; 42°22′31″N 71°22′49″W	Wayland	
137	Old Town Hall	Old Town Hall	February 2, 2005 (#04001574)	10 Kendal Rd. 42°40′32″N 71°25′29″W	Tyngsborough	
138	Christopher Page House	Christopher Page House	March 9, 1990 (#90000163)	2 Meyers Ln. 42°29′47″N 71°15′32″W	Bedford	
139	Nathaniel Page House	Nathaniel Page House	March 29, 1978 (#78000433)	89 Page Rd. 42°29′37″N 71°15′48″W	Bedford	
140	Parker Village Historic District	Parker Village Historic District	December 27, 2002 (#02001613)	Concord, Carlisle, Old Lowell, and Griffin Rds. 42°32′56″N 71°25′01″W	Westford	
141	James Parker House	James Parker House	February 25, 1988 (#88000163)	R.R. 1, Box 30 Center Rd. 42°33′36″N 71°39′32″W	Shirley	
142	The Parsonage	The Parsonage	November 11, 1971 (#71000903)	16 Pleasant St. 42°16′15″N 71°18′54″W	Natick	National Historic Landmark
143	Pepperell Center Historic District	Pepperell Center Historic District	August 5, 1994 (#94000812)	Roughly, along Park, Main, Elm, Townsend and Heald Sts. 42°40′01″N 71°35′55″W	Pepperell	
144	Pleasant Street Historic District	Pleasant Street Historic District	June 12, 1979 (#79000353)	Irregular Pattern along Pleasant St. 42°23′54″N 71°10′36″W	Belmont	
145	Pleasant Street School	Pleasant Street School	January 23, 1986 (#86000094)	Pleasant St. 42°33′51″N 71°35′15″W	Ayer	
146	Miles Pratt House	Miles Pratt House	May 9, 1985 (#85000980)	106 Mt. Auburn St. 42°22′03″N 71°10′49″W	Watertown	
147	John Proctor House	John Proctor House	February 4, 1993 (#93000011)	218 Concord Rd. 42°33′07″N 71°25′44″W	Westford	
148	Rev. Daniel Putnam House	Rev. Daniel Putnam House	March 9, 1990 (#90000176)	27 Bow St. 42°34′27″N 71°04′40″W	North Reading	
149	Randall-Hale Homestead	Randall-Hale Homestead	March 22, 1996 (#96000277)	6 Sudbury Rd. 42°24′28″N 71°31′26″W	Stow	
150	Red Top	Red Top	November 11, 1971 (#71000911)	90 Somerset St. 42°24′01″N 71°10′46″W	Belmont	National Historic Landmark
151	Reed-Wood Place	Reed-Wood Place	September 14, 2000 (#00001071)	20 Meetinghouse Rd. 42°32′47″N 71°28′20″W	Littleton	
152	Reeves Tavern	Reeves Tavern	November 15, 2016 (#16000770)	126 Old Connecticut Path; 42°21′07″N 71°21′04″W	Wayland	
153	Revere Beach Parkway-Metropolitan Park System of Greater Boston	Revere Beach Parkway-Metropolitan Park System of Greater Boston	December 6, 2007 (#07001241)	Revere Beach Pkwy; 42°24′16″N 71°01′49″W	Everett, Medford, and Chelsea	
154	George Robbins House	George Robbins House	March 9, 1990 (#90000168)	523 Curve St. 42°33′11″N 71°21′05″W	Carlisle	
155	John Robbins House	John Robbins House	July 25, 2003 (#03000682)	144 Great Rd. 42°28′59″N 71°24′57″W	Acton	
156	Count Rumford Birthplace	Count Rumford Birthplace	May 15, 1975 (#75001942)	90 Elm St. 42°28′45″N 71°08′50″W	Woburn	National Historic Landmark
157	Russian Cemetery	Russian Cemetery	November 25, 2005 (#05001324)	Patten Rd. 42°34′41″N 71°28′17″W	Westford	
158	Sabbath Day House	Sabbath Day House	August 14, 1973 (#73000285)	20 Andover Rd. 42°33′39″N 71°16′03″W	Billerica	
159	St. Paul's Parish Church	St. Paul's Parish Church	September 28, 2001 (#01001199)	26 Washington St. 42°25′54″N 71°04′37″W	Malden	
160	Sandy Pond School	Sandy Pond School	May 8, 2017 (#100000971)	150 Sandy Pond Rd. 42°33′34″N 71°32′27″W	Ayer	
161	Shawsheen Cemetery	Shawsheen Cemetery	June 12, 2007 (#07000547)	Great Rd. and Shawsheen Rd. 42°29′08″N 71°15′33″W	Bedford	
162	Shirley Center Historic District	Shirley Center Historic District	September 1, 1988 (#88001454)	Brown, Center, Horsepond, Parker, and Whitney Rds. 42°34′18″N 71°39′03″W	Shirley	
163	Shirley Shaker Village	Shirley Shaker Village	May 24, 1976 (#76000271)	South of Shirley on Harvard Rd. 42°31′35″N 71°39′06″W	Shirley	Extends into Lancaster in Worcester County.
164	Shirley Village Historic District	Shirley Village Historic District	January 23, 1992 (#91001958)	Roughly bounded by Center, Harvard, Leominster and Shaker Rds. 42°32′33″N 71°39′07″W	Shirley	
165	Zeb Spaulding House	Zeb Spaulding House	March 9, 1990 (#90000169)	1044 Lowell Rd. 42°33′25″N 71°21′13″W	Carlisle	
166	Stone's Bridge	Stone's Bridge	January 17, 2017 (#100000527)	Old Stonebridge Rd. across Sudbury River; 42°20′21″N 71°23′42″W	Wayland	Extends into Framingham
167	Sudbury Aqueduct Linear District	Sudbury Aqueduct Linear District	January 18, 1990 (#89002293)	Along Sudbury Aqueduct from Farm Pond at Waverly St. (Framingham) to Chestnut Hill Reservoir (Newton); 42°17′33″N 71°18′44″W	Natick	Extends into Wellesley and Needham in Norfolk County, and Framingham, Newton and Sherborn in Middlesex County.
168	Sudbury Center Historic District	Sudbury Center Historic District	July 14, 1976 (#76000277)	Concord and Old Sudbury Rds. 42°22′53″N 71°24′18″W	Sudbury	
169	Tenney Homestead	Tenney Homestead	March 9, 1990 (#90000181)	156 Taylor Rd. 42°26′51″N 71°30′52″W	Stow	
170	Tewksbury State Hospital	Tewksbury State Hospital	January 21, 1994 (#93001486)	Junction of East and Livingston Sts. 42°36′31″N 71°12′43″W	Tewksbury	
171	Town Diner	Town Diner	September 22, 1999 (#99001127)	627 Mount Auburn St. 42°22′15″N 71°09′31″W	Watertown	
172	Trinity Episcopal Church	Trinity Episcopal Church	May 26, 1995 (#95000660)	131 W. Emerson St. 42°27′34″N 71°04′09″W	Melrose	
173	Two Brothers Rocks-Dudley Road Historic District	Two Brothers Rocks-Dudley Road Historic District	September 23, 2010 (#10000790)	Roughly Dudley Rd. between Chestnut Lane and Emery Rd., Bedford and Timbercreek Lane, Billerica, from Massachusetts Route 4 to the Concord River; 42°31′00″N 71°17′50″W	Bedford and Billerica	
174	Col. Jonathan Tyng House	Col. Jonathan Tyng House	August 19, 1977 (#77000188)	80 Tyng Rd. 42°39′37″N 71°24′28″W	Tyngsborough	Destroyed in a fire.
175	Phineas Upham House	Phineas Upham House	March 9, 1990 (#90000173)	255 Upham St. 42°27′29″N 71°03′10″W	Melrose	
176	US Post Office-Woburn Center Station	US Post Office-Woburn Center Station	October 19, 1987 (#86003436)	1 Abbott St. 42°28′53″N 71°04′09″W	Woburn	
177	Waitt Brick Block	Waitt Brick Block	November 12, 1982 (#82000492)	422–424 Main St. 42°25′35″N 71°04′05″W	Malden	
178	Walcott-Whitney House	Walcott-Whitney House	March 9, 1990 (#90000183)	137 Tuttle Ln. 42°27′05″N 71°29′10″W	Stow	
179	Watertown Arsenal Historic District	Watertown Arsenal Historic District	May 14, 1999 (#99000498)	Arsenal St. 42°21′44″N 71°09′58″W	Watertown	
180	Old Watertown High School	Old Watertown High School	September 22, 2006 (#06000860)	341 Mount Auburn St. 42°22′08″N 71°10′13″W	Watertown	
181	Wayland Center Historic District	Wayland Center Historic District	September 6, 1974 (#74000378)	Irregular pattern along both sides of U.S. Route 20 and MA 27; 42°21′49″N 71°21′35″W	Wayland	
182	Wayside Inn Historic District	Wayside Inn Historic District	April 23, 1973 (#73000307)	Old Boston Post Rd. 42°21′28″N 71°28′05″W	Sudbury	
183	West School	West School	May 17, 2006 (#06000398)	106 Bedford St. 42°30′22″N 71°13′10″W	Burlington	
184	West Schoolhouse	West Schoolhouse	February 21, 1990 (#90000144)	141 Shawsheen Ave. 42°33′22″N 71°11′25″W	Wilmington	
185	Westford Center Historic District	Westford Center Historic District	August 28, 1998 (#98001105)	Roughly along Graniteville Rd., Main St., Lincoln St., and Depot St. 42°34′50″N 71°26′19″W	Westford	
186	Westford Town Farm	Westford Town Farm	March 14, 2008 (#08000167)	35 Town Farm Rd. 42°35′11″N 71°28′44″W	Westford	
187	Westlawn Cemetery	Westlawn Cemetery	January 5, 2005 (#04001433)	Concord Rd. 42°34′16″N 71°28′02″W	Westford	
188	Weston Aqueduct Linear District	Weston Aqueduct Linear District	January 18, 1990 (#89002274)	Along the Weston Aqueduct from the Sudbury Reservoir to the Weston Reservoir; 42°20′00″N 71°22′32″W	Wayland	Extends into Southborough, Worcester County and Framingham and Weston in Middlesex County.
189	Levi Wetherbee Farm	Levi Wetherbee Farm	December 12, 2006 (#06001128)	484 Middle Rd. 42°29′27″N 71°31′23″W	Boxborough	
190	Wilmington Centre Village Historic District	Wilmington Centre Village Historic District	April 8, 1992 (#92000246)	Roughly Middlesex Dr. and Church St. from Adams St. to Wildwood Cemetery; 42°33′22″N 71°09′52″W	Wilmington	
191	Wilson Mill-Old Burlington Road District	Wilson Mill-Old Burlington Road District	August 18, 2003 (#03000792)	Old Burlington Rd. and Wilson Rd. 42°30′04″N 71°14′46″W	Bedford	
192	Henry Wilson Shoe Shop	Henry Wilson Shoe Shop	August 24, 2000 (#00000955)	181 W. Central St. 42°16′58″N 71°22′55″W	Natick	
193	Woburn Public Library	Woburn Public Library	November 13, 1976 (#76000290)	Pleasant St. 42°28′44″N 71°09′18″W	Woburn	National Historic Landmark
194	Winslow School and Littlefield Library	Winslow School and Littlefield Library	March 7, 2017 (#100000722)	250 & 252 Middlesex Rd. 42°40′40″N 71°25′28″W	Tyngsborough	
195	Woods End Road Historic District	Woods End Road Historic District	July 8, 1988 (#88000956)	68 Baker Bridge Rd. and 1, 5, 9, and 10 Woods End Rd. 42°25′36″N 71°19′41″W	Lincoln	
196	Wright Cemetery	Wright Cemetery	December 6, 2005 (#05001372)	Groton Rd. 42°36′32″N 71°28′03″W	Westford	
197	Francis Wyman House	Francis Wyman House	March 17, 1975 (#75000255)	56 Francis Wyman St. 42°31′06″N 71°13′31″W	Burlington	

== Former listings ==
	Name on the Register	Image	Date listed	Date removed	Location	City or town	Description
1	Allen Crocker Curtis House-Pillar House	Allen Crocker Curtis House-Pillar House	September 4, 1986 (#86001787)	February 8, 2024	Old Sudbury Road; 42°24′04″N 71°19′58″W	Lincoln	Originally listed at 26 Quinobequin Rd., Newton; building was reconstructed in 2005 at new location.
2	Abraham Jaquith House	Abraham Jaquith House	March 14, 1991 (#90000166)	February 8, 2024	161 Concord Rd. 42°32′53″N 71°16′50″W	Billerica	Dismantled c. 2000; parts supposedly survive in Gilmanton, New Hampshire.
3	Old City Hall	Old City Hall	October 8, 1976 (#76002001)	February 20, 1980	Main St. at Pleasant St. 42°25′34″N 71°04′02″W	Malden	Built 1857, demolished 1979.
