= Browne-Masonic Building =

- U.S. National Register of Historic Places
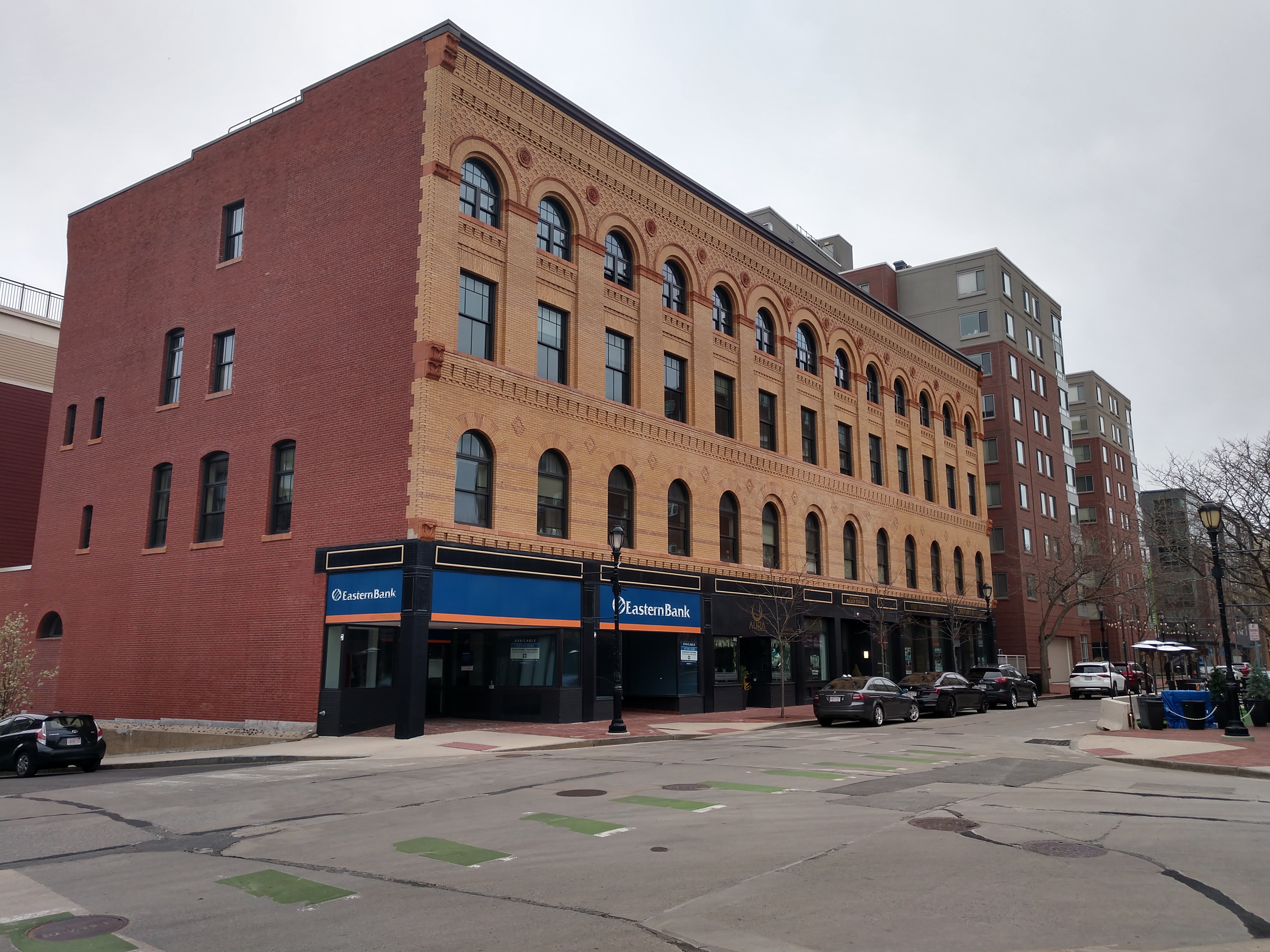

- Location within Massachusetts Location within the United States
- Location: 126-150 Pleasant St., Malden, Massachusetts
- Coordinates: 42°25′38″N 71°4′15″W
- Area: 0.52 acres (0.21 ha)
- Built: 1894
- Architect: Hartwell & Richardson
- Architectural style: Classical Revival
- NRHP reference No.: 100007522
- Added to NRHP: March 22, 2022

The Browne-Masonic Building is a historic commercial and fraternal organization building at 126-150 Pleasant Street in Malden, Massachusetts. Built in 1894, it is a good example of Classical Revival architecture, designed by the prominent Boston firm Hartwell & Richardson. The building from its inception served as a home for a variety of fraternal organizations, notably housing local Masonic organization for much of the 20th century. The four-story brick building now houses commercial space on the ground floor and residences in the upper stories. It was listed on the National Register of Historic Places in 2022.

== Description and history ==
The Browne-Masonic Building is located in downtown Malden, on the south side of Pleasant Street west of Main Street. It occupies the eastern half of a block bounded by Pleasant, Abbott, and Exchange Streets, and Washington Street South, with its main facade facing north. It is four stories in height, its exterior clad primarily in pale yellow brick. The facade is embellished with terra cotta panels and patterned brick detailing. The ground floor has modern commercial storefronts, while the upper floors have window bays with rounded arches at the second and fourth floors.

The block was built in 1894 on land owned by Addie and Edward Browne, a former estate property Addie inherited from her father. It was apparently built to serve both commercial businesses, and as a home for some of Malden's many fraternal organizations. Each of its upper floors house a large meeting space, and these were rented in the early years by chapters of the Independent Order of Odd Fellows. Masonic organizations began renting spaces in the building as early as 1900, and were its principal upper-floor tenants by the late 1920s. The building went through a number of owners before its acquisition by a Masonic umbrella group in 1961. The Masons owner the building until 2013, after which it was rehabilitated and adapted to its present commercial and residential uses.

== See also ==
- National Register of Historic Places listings in Middlesex County, Massachusetts
