= Phineas Upham House =

Historic house in Massachusetts, United States

- U.S. National Register of Historic Places
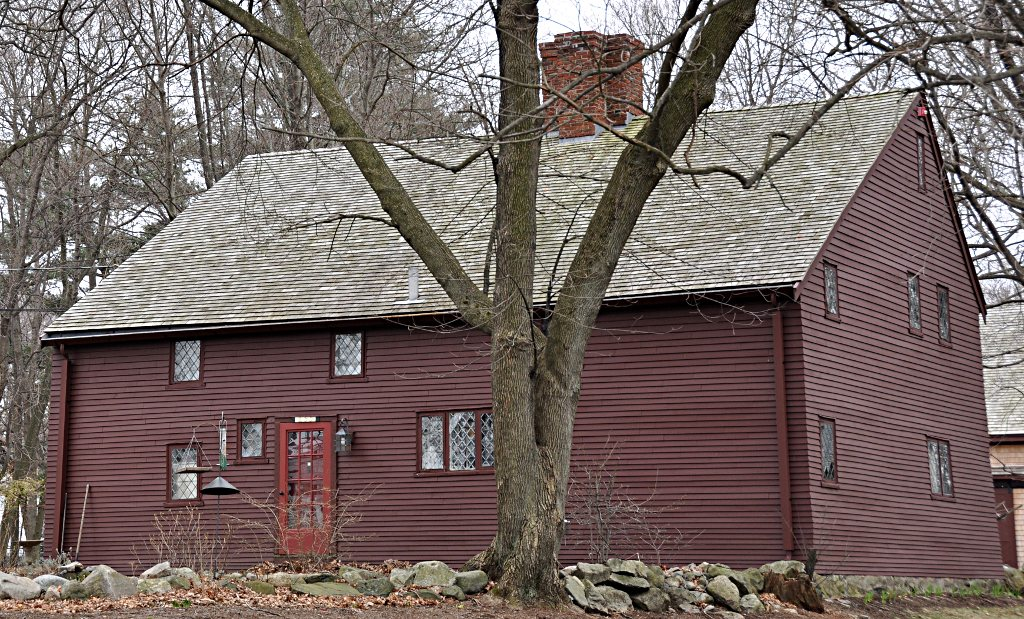

- Location within Massachusetts Location within the United States
- Location: 255 Upham St., Melrose, Massachusetts
- Coordinates: 42°27′29″N 71°3′10″W
- Area: less than one acre
- Built: c. 1730
- Architectural style: Colonial
- MPS: First Period Buildings of Eastern Massachusetts TR
- NRHP reference No.: 90000173
- Added to NRHP: March 9, 1990

The Phineas Upham House is a historic house at 255 Upham Street in Melrose, Massachusetts. Built in the early 18th century, it is a well preserved example of First Period architecture. Owned by a family association, it is only occasionally open to the public. It was added to the National Register of Historic Places in 1990.

== Description and history ==
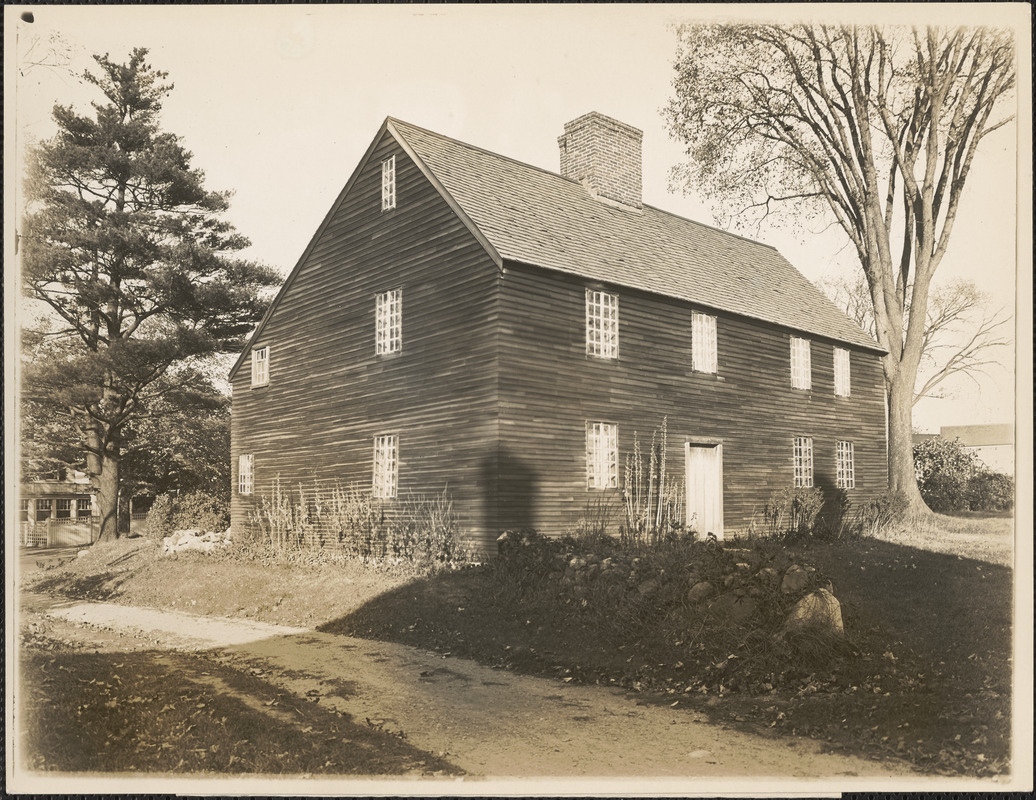
The Phineas Upham House, Upham Street (opposite Lincoln Street), Melrose, Mass., [October 1920]. Leon Abdalian Collection, Boston Public Library.

The Phineas Upham house is located in what is now a residential area east of downtown Melrose, on the south side of Upham Street opposite its junction with Lincoln Street. It is a 2 1/2-story timber-frame house, three bays wide and two deep, with an off-center entrance and a centered chimney. Its window arrangement is irregular, with different sizes and shapes now filled with replacement diamond-paned casements. It probably began as a simple two-bay house, left of the chimney and was extended later in the 18th century with the addition of the third bay to the chimney's right. The rear of the house was also originally a single story (giving the house a saltbox appearance), but the roof was raised to a full two stories in the late 18th or early 19th century.

The house's construction date is claimed by some local historians to be c. 1703, not long after Phineas Upham arrived in the area that is now Melrose. However, architectural and other historical evidence suggests that it was actually built by Phineas Upham for his son Amos, and would thus date to the late 1730s instead. The house remained in Upham family hands until the early 20th century. Its last occupant moved out in 1907, and in 1913 it was purchased by the Melrose Historical Society and restored. The Upham Family Association assumed ownership of the property in 1940, and now open it to the public two days each year.

== See also ==
- National Register of Historic Places listings in Middlesex County, Massachusetts
