= Levi Wetherbee Farm =

- U.S. National Register of Historic Places
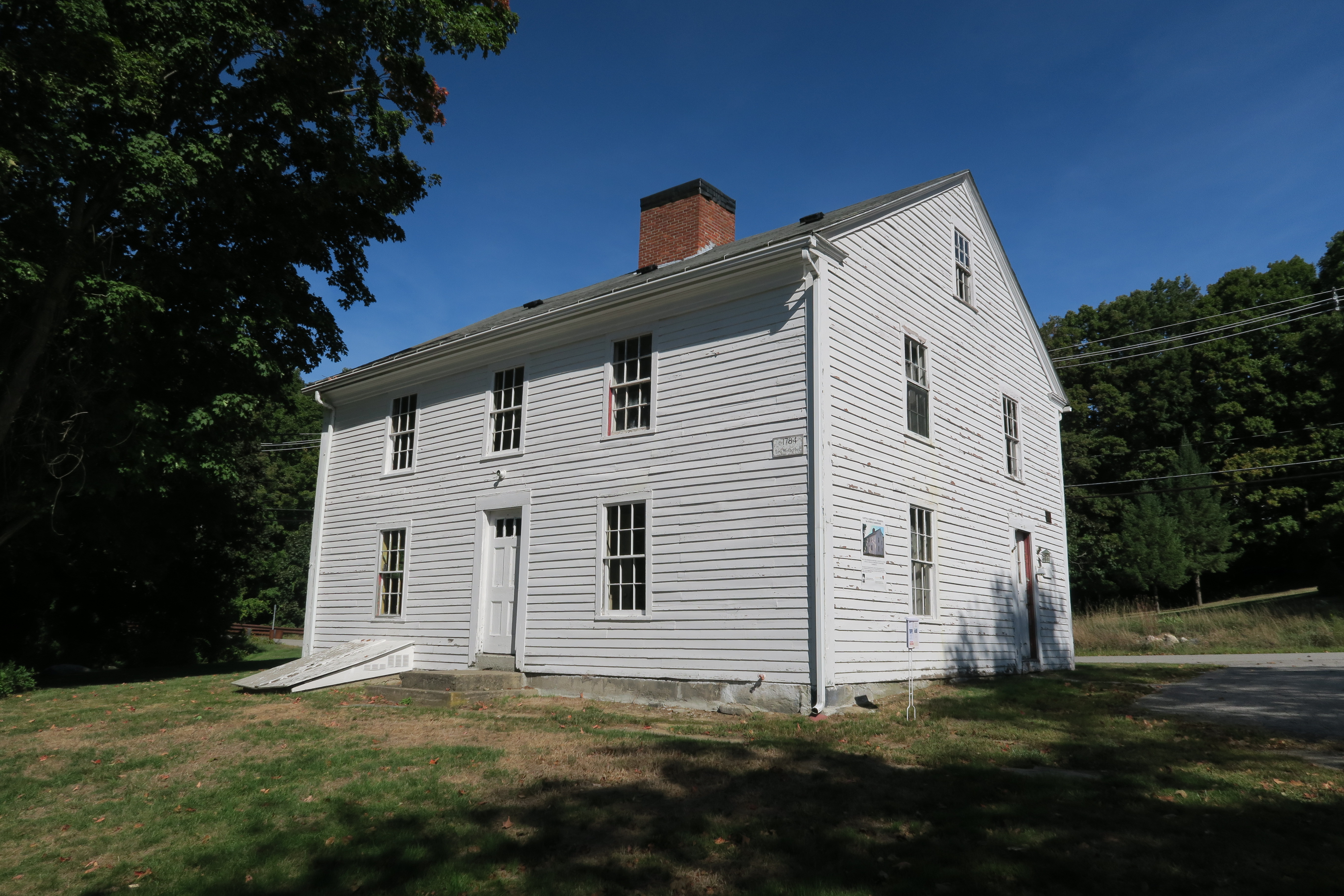
- Levi Wetherbee Farm

- Location within Massachusetts Location within the United States
- Location: Boxborough, Massachusetts
- Coordinates: 42°29′16″N 71°31′30″W
- Area: 36.19 acres (14.65 ha)
- Built: 1784
- Architect: Steele, Thomas A.
- Architectural style: Georgian
- NRHP reference No.: 06001128
- Added to NRHP: December 12, 2006

The Levi Wetherbee Farm is a historic farm at 484 Middle Road in Boxborough, Massachusetts. The 36-acre (15 ha) property includes a farmhouse which dates to the mid-18th century (with additions and enlargement in the 19th century), rough fieldstone walls delineating some of its property lines, a c. 1904 icehouse that was relocated from another nearby farm, and heavily rutted car tracks indicating the agricultural use of the property for more than 250 years.

The farm was added to the National Register of Historic Places in 2006.

== See also ==
- National Register of Historic Places listings in Middlesex County, Massachusetts
