= History of Acton, Massachusetts =

Acton, Massachusetts is a small town west of Boston in an area that has records of human habitation which stretch back 7000 years. Acton citizens had a significant role in the Battle of Lexington and Concord, the prelude to the American Revolution. Acton's history reflects the major events that were occurring in Massachusetts, New England, the United States, and the world.

== Early settlement ==
The rivers that run through Acton were used by Native Americans as part of their annual migration patterns thousands of years ago. A Native American archaeological site was discovered in Acton in 1999 which produced evidence of habitation dating back 7000 years. This site has been named the Pine Hawk site and is one of the oldest archaeological sites in New England.

Before European colonists settled in the area, the Massachusett tribe of the Algonquins lived in eastern Massachusetts. The group who lived in the Acton area were members of the Pawtucket people. They practiced swidden agriculture where they would use a field for several years until soil fertility dropped and then move to another field.

Around 1615, an epidemic killed almost 90% of the Native Americans in eastern Massachusetts. The description of the symptoms lead current historians to believe that this disease was viral hepatitis introduced by European traders and sailors. The epidemic had such a huge impact because the native residents had no resistance to European diseases. A smallpox epidemic swept through in 1633 and further devastated the region.

== Colonial Acton ==
The first colonial settlement in this area was Concord which was incorporated in 1635. Concord, which was the first inland settlement of the Massachusetts Bay Colony, encompassing the present day towns of Acton, Lincoln, and Carlisle. Concord sits at the junction where the Assabet and Sudbury rivers combine to form the Concord River. Concord farmers used the land which is now Acton as grazing fields for their animals. The first permanent residents of Acton settled the area in 1639; siting their residences among the pastures that ran along the Nashoba Brook flood plain. They were farmers who needed to be closer to the grazing fields for their animals. They called this section of town Concord Village.

In the mid-17th century, colonists began a program of converting Native Americans to Christianity. The converted Indians were settled into towns which were known as 'Praying Indian Towns'. One of these towns (Nashobah) was located on the land around Fort Pond from Nagog Pond around both sides south to Fort Pond Hill. The eastern part of Nashobah straddles the town line between Acton and Littleton. Several prominent Praying Indians such as Peter Jethro lived in the Praying Town. Nashobah was also known as Newtown resulting in the present-day confusion of Newtown Road Acton and Newtown Road Littleton, both of which lead to the north slope of Fort Pond Hill.

When King Philip's War (1675–1676) broke out, the Praying Indians were considered with suspicion by the colonists. In October 1675, the General Council in Boston ordered that all Praying Indians be removed from their towns and taken to Deer Island in Boston Harbor. They were released in 1677 when King Philip's War was over.

Residents of the Massachusetts Bay Colony were required to attend Sunday Services and to support through taxation the colony's official religion: Congregationalism. With travel along colonial roads difficult, the Sunday attendance requirement became a burden for the residents of what would become Acton. These residents petitioned the Colony's legislature, the General Court, for the right to have their own meeting house (aka Church) and hire their own minister. With the approval of the General Court, Acton was incorporated as an independent town on July 3, 1735. Acton has held Annual Town Meetings since 1735 and the records of those Town Meetings are held at Acton's Memorial Library ().

== American Revolution ==
In the period before the outbreak of hostilities with Great Britain that eventually led to the American Revolution, the relations between colonists and Great Britain grew increasingly strained. In May 1774, the British Parliament passed a law which made it illegal for colonists to hold Town Meetings and to legislate their own affairs. In defiance of this law, the Town of Acton held a series of Town Meetings where they elected a representative to the illegal Provincial Congress and began to raise a local militia unit. The Town of Acton sent a list of grievances to King George III on October 3, 1774. The anniversary of this day is celebrated in Acton as Crown Resistance Day

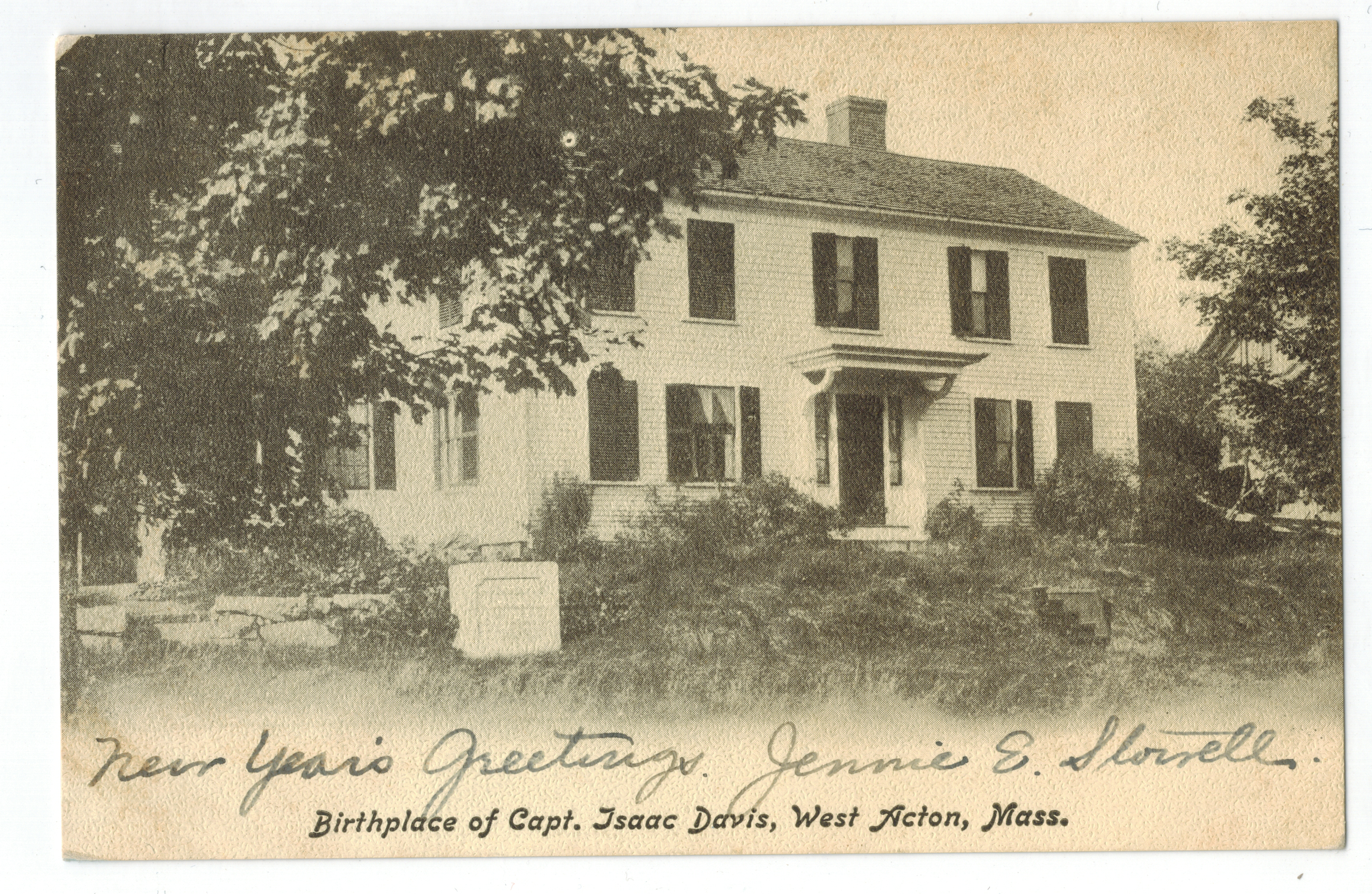
Isaac Davis' birth house in Acton, Massachusetts in 1905 (left) and 2015 (right)

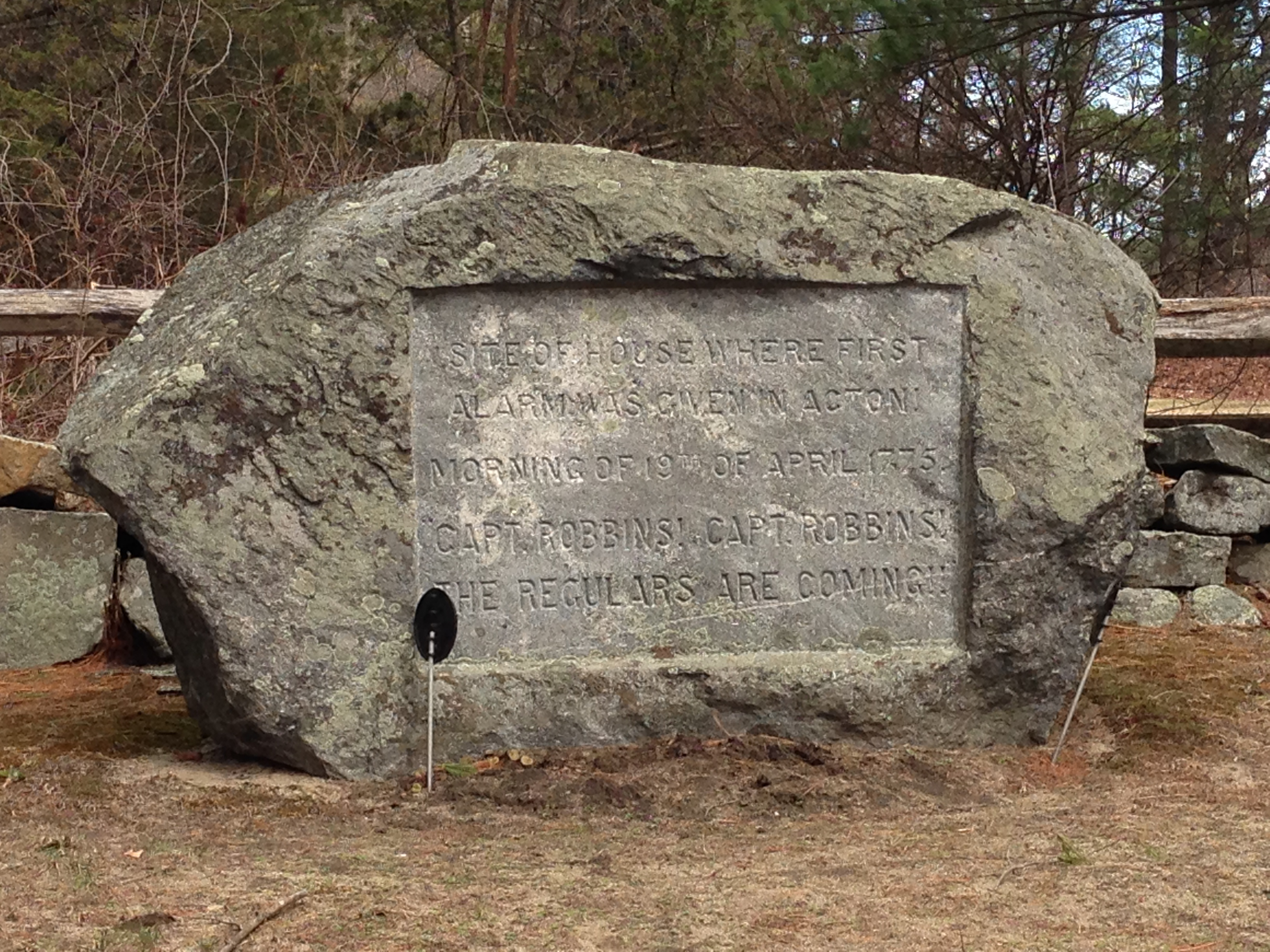
a marker

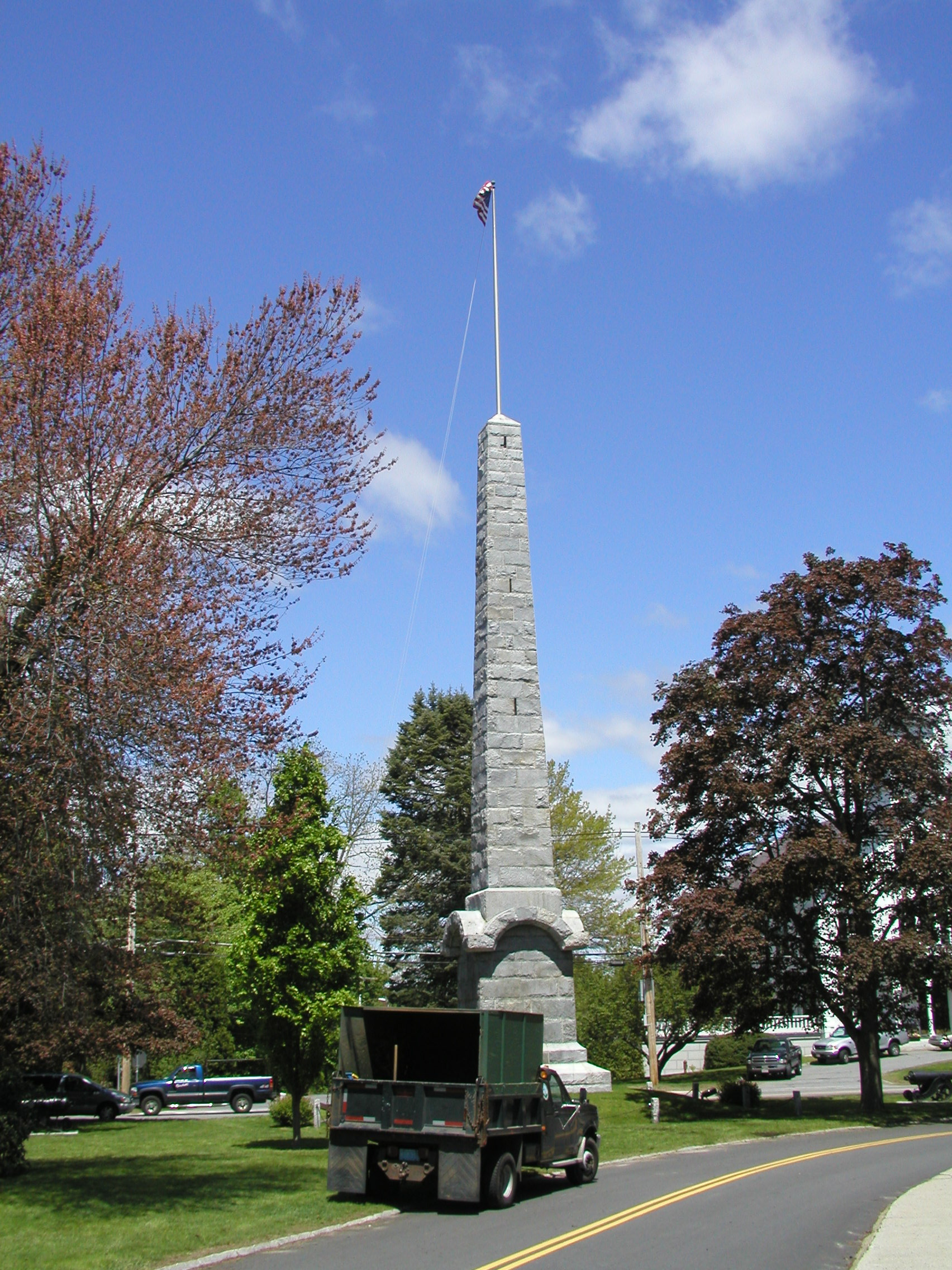
Isaac Davis Monument

At the beginning of the American Revolutionary War, on April 19, 1775, a company of minutemen from Acton responded to the call to arms initiated by Paul Revere (who rode with other riders, William Dawes and Samuel Prescott, with Prescott the only one of the three who was able reach Acton itself) and fought at the North Bridge in Concord as part of the Battle of Lexington and Concord. The Acton minutemen were led by Captain Isaac Davis. When a company was needed to lead the advance on the bridge which was defended by the British regulars, Captain Davis was heard to reply, "I haven't a man who is afraid to go."

The colonists advanced on the bridge. The men from Acton were in the front lines, since they were the only company completely outfitted with bayonets. In the exchange of musket fire that followed, Captain Isaac Davis and Private James Hayward were killed and Abner Hosmer, also of Acton, was mortally wounded. Thus, Isaac Davis was the first officer to die in the American Revolutionary War.

Each year on Patriot's Day (the 3rd Monday in April), the Acton Minutemen lead a march from Acton Center to the Old North Bridge in Concord. This route is known as the 'Isaac Davis Trail' and is listed on the National Register of Historic Places. Since the 1960s, The Scouters of the Isaac Davis Trail have organized an annual Patriot's Day campout and march on the Isaac Davis Trail.

== The 1800s: Industrialization and Civil War ==
After the Revolutionary War, Acton continued to grow in population. By the mid-19th century, Acton was an industrial center for the production of barrels (cooperage). There were also three grist mills and four saw mills in town. While several of these mills were sited on Fort Pond Brook in South Acton, several of them were sited on Nashoba Brook in the North and East Acton areas of town. The fulling mill at Mill Corner was one of the first large-scale manufacturers of woolen cloth in the country. Gun powder mills (1835-1940) were located along the Assabet River, in the southernmost part of Acton. This operation became well known as American Powder Mills, with business offices in Boston and Chicago.

The towns of Acton and Concord were also instrumental in the development of the modern day pencil industry. Concordian William Munroe is credited with being the first to manufacture wooden pencils in the United States in 1812. Acton resident Ebenezer Wood found Munroe's manufacturing methods painstakingly slow and set out to automate the process at his mill on in North Acton, along the old Davis Road. Wood became the first to use a circular saw to speed the cutting and a gluing process that could make 144 pencils at once. His process improvements created pencils in either hexagonal or octagonal shapes. These shapes have become standard. Wood never patented his invention and shared his improvements with others, including Eberhardt Faber of New York. Faber became the country's leading manufacturer of pencils. In the latter half of the century, industry continued to grow in Acton with the establishment of a cigar factory and a piano stool factory

In 1843, the railroad came to Acton. The Fitchburg Railroad was routed through South and West Acton so that it could serve the mills. South Acton became a busy commerce center with the construction of the Marlborough Branch Railroad. The branch ran from South Acton through Maynard, Stow and Hudson to reach its terminus in the city of Marlborough. The increased traffic led to further commercial development in the area, such as the establishment of the Tuttle Store and the construction of Exchange Hall. The Tuttle Store was a precursor to modern day department stores.

In addition to the Fitchburg Railroad, two other railroads bisected Acton: the Framingham and Lowell and the Nashua, Acton and Boston Railroad. The Framingham and Lowell was part of the Northern Division of the Old Colony Railroad which eventually became a subsidiary of the New York, New Haven and Hartford Rail Road (a.k.a. The New Haven Railroad). The Nashua, Acton & Boston ran from Concord Junction (aka West Concord) to Nashua, through Westford and Dunstable. These two railroads shared a double track right-of-way that runs along Nashoba Brook to North Acton where they diverged near the North Acton Station, which was located at the end of Harris Street. The Framingham and Lowell right-of-way is now known as the Bruce Freeman Rail Trail and is various stages of completion.

In 1850, the Fugitive Slave Act was passed. In response, Acton Town Meeting passed a set of resolutions condemning the Act. The governor of Massachusetts, John C. Andrew, urged all towns to prepare their militia units for the threatening war. On April 12, 1861 the Civil War Began.

On April 15, President Lincoln issued a call for 75,000 volunteers. By 7:30 the next morning, Captain Tuttle with his entire command of 52 men reported to Lowell, fully equipped and ready for duty. Company E of Acton of the 6th Massachusetts Militia was to be the first company of the first regiment of the Union Army to arrive in Washington in response to the President's call.

In addition, the Acton reservists were among the troops at Fort Sumter when it was fired upon.

In 1874, the population of the town was almost 1700. The town established its first newspaper The Acton Patriot and the residents of West Acton formed the first library The Citizen's Library. In 1890, the Memorial Library was completed and given to the town by William Allan Wilde as a memorial to the Acton soldiers who fought in the Civil War.

== The 1900s: The Growth of Suburban Acton ==
=== 1900-1950 ===
At the beginning on the 20th century, Acton had approximately 2120 residents. The primary business of the town was agriculture. The 20th century saw substantial growth and change in the town.

In 1912, after prolonged debate, a Water District was established which provided water initially to the West Acton and South Acton villages. At this time, each of the five villages had its own fire department. On July 22, 1913, there was a very serious fire in West Acton. It destroyed houses, barns, businesses and factories. The whole village might have burned if not for the newly installed water system. After the fire, Town Meeting voted to establish a town-wide volunteer fire department.

Acton had excellent roads due to a contribution from a former Acton resident - Alvin Nothrop. He had grown up in Acton before moving to Washington D.C., where he became a successful merchant. He donated money to the town of Acton to purchase a stone crusher for improving local roads. Because of this contribution, Acton had water-bound macadam highways long before its neighbors. With the advent of the Automobile, the railroads serving East and North Acton fell into decline. The Nashua and Acton line was completely abandoned in the mid-1920s while passenger service ceased on the Framingham and Lowell line in the 1930s with the last vestiges of service on the line occurring to North Acton lumberyards in the early 1990s. This line too, has been formally abandoned. The Framingham and Lowell line is in the process of being converted into a rail trail, with the Acton portion scheduled for 2015.

The Board of Health was instituted in 1901 and its first task was to administer the smallpox vaccine to the children in the local schools.

Each village in Acton had its own grade school but the town struggled with how to provide a high school education for its students. For most of the early 20th century (until 1925), Acton students were sent to Concord's high school. In 1925, Acton population was large enough to sustain its own high school, which was built on Massachusetts Avenue (rt 111) near the intersection of Main Street (rt 27). The building, which still stands, was converted into use as an elementary school and then, in 2012, was converted into residential housing.

=== 1950-2000 ===
The last half of the 20th century saw enormous growth and change in Acton. In 1950, the town had a population of 3,500 which grew to 17,000 by 1974. This was largely caused by the growth in industry in suburban areas - facilitated by the construction of Route 128. Acton did not attract a large number of industrial sites because of the limited water supply.

Instead, Acton became a bedroom community with an increased housing demand due to two main factors, the Baby Boom and the Cold War. As GI-Bill educated women and men in Boston and its inner suburbs entered the employment sector they found housing in their hometowns expensive and tight leading many to look beyond State Highway 128 which was being absorbed into the Interstate system as s portion of Interstate-95. At the same time, the Cold War expansion of Fort Devens, Hanscom AFB, and Natick Labs accompanied by the growth of high technology DoD contractors spurred a large increase in college-educated professionals seeking housing within commuting distance. To meet this demand and benefit financially, a lot of Acton's farmland began to turn into housing developments.

In 1954, the Town established a Planning Board which developed regulations regarding the development of subdivisions. The first large subdivision was Indian Village (built on the southern slope of Fort Pond Hill - bisected by Route 2 in 1952 - and the adjacent flatland) in West Acton in 1955. Other notable subdivisions include Patriots Hill (located between Route 2 & the town center - which was heavily expanded upon in the late 90s), Minuteman Ridge (located off Massachusetts Avenue [Route 111], Forest Glen (located near the Stow border), and The Arbors (located off of Great Road or Route 119 / 2A). Smaller subdivisions were built as individual farmers sold their orchards, chicken farms, and dairy farms to developers.

Acton's increasing housing stock and willingness of farmers to sell their land continued to drive growth through the 1950s and into the 1970s. Alongside the DoD contract-fueled high technology innovation and development, commercial and non-DoD government contracts spurred a robust civilian high tech and information industry that was expanding in office parks along Rt 128/I 95 in the 1960s through 1980s and then along Interstate 495 in the late 1980s till present. Digital Equipment Corporation's establishment in the Maynard Mills made Acton an attractive place to live and drove development of the apartment buildings and condominiums in town. Between 1965 and 1975, all the truck farms along 2A, which were the most commercially profitable farms in town were replaced by shopping centers and apartment buildings. Nagog Office Park (1974) further hastened the development of the Rt 2A corridor as a retail and office building location. This thriving civilian sector allowed Acton to better weather the Nixon Administration's dramatic cutting of Federal Agency presence in the Commonwealth (NASA leaving Cambridge, Boston Navy Yard closing) in revenge for the 1972 election as well as the Post-Vietnam recession that hit other DoD fed areas (Tidewater Virginia, Seattle, St Louis, and San Diego, for example).

The population in the town doubled between 1950 and 1960 (from 3500 to 7000). It doubled again in the next decade. This increase made Acton look at its public schools to expand. In 1953, new schools were constructed to accommodate the growth in the student population. In 1957, Acton and Boxborough created a regional school district for grades 7 -12 (Littleton pulled out of the planned regional district halfway through the planning process). The Merriam School was constructed in 1958. Other schools quickly followed (Douglas (1966), Gates (1968), and Conant (1971)). In 1967 a building was constructed for the Junior High. In 1973 a huge addition was added to this building and it became the high school (the junior high moved to the old high school building). In the 1990, it was clear that both the Merriam and the McCarthy Towne buildings were obsolete. In 1998, the town constructed a single replacement building, called the Parker Damon Building, to house both schools. The school run separate programs but share gym and cafeteria space.

The Blanchard foundation gave Acton the money to construct Blanchard Auditorium for the town's High School, the building has since been converted to the R. J. Grey Jr High School. The Auditorium, which also doubles as gym, was used to hold Town Meeting until the new (current) High School Auditorium was constructed.

In the last quarter of the 20th century, conservation also became a driving factor in the development of the town. A desire to protect existing open-space combined with the need for additional recreation areas led the town to acquire and set aside over 1,650 acres (6.7 km^{2}) for conservation purposes. This included the development of the North Acton Recreation Area (NARA) in the late 1990s. NARA provided the town with its first outdoor beach and swim area as well as a significant space for playing fields and an outdoor amphitheater. In 2011 NARA was renamed after Nathaniel Allen, an Acton resident who was awarded the Congressional Medal of Honor for his actions during the Civil War.

== 2000s: Continued Suburban Growth ==
In the early 21st century, Acton continued its population growth including the addition of the Canterbury Hill development, located near the borders with Carlisle & Westford, that contain over 90 houses. This was followed by the building of 153 homes on a portion of the Quail Ridge Country Club, located off Great Road (route 119 / 2A). These developments may represent a bit of a watershed in Acton's development as the availability of other open tracts is limited.

In 2012, the towns of Acton and Boxborough began exploring the complete regionalization of the towns school by absorbing Boxborough's Blanchard Elementary school into the system.
