= Faulkner House (Acton, Massachusetts) =

Historic house in Massachusetts, United States

- U.S. National Register of Historic Places
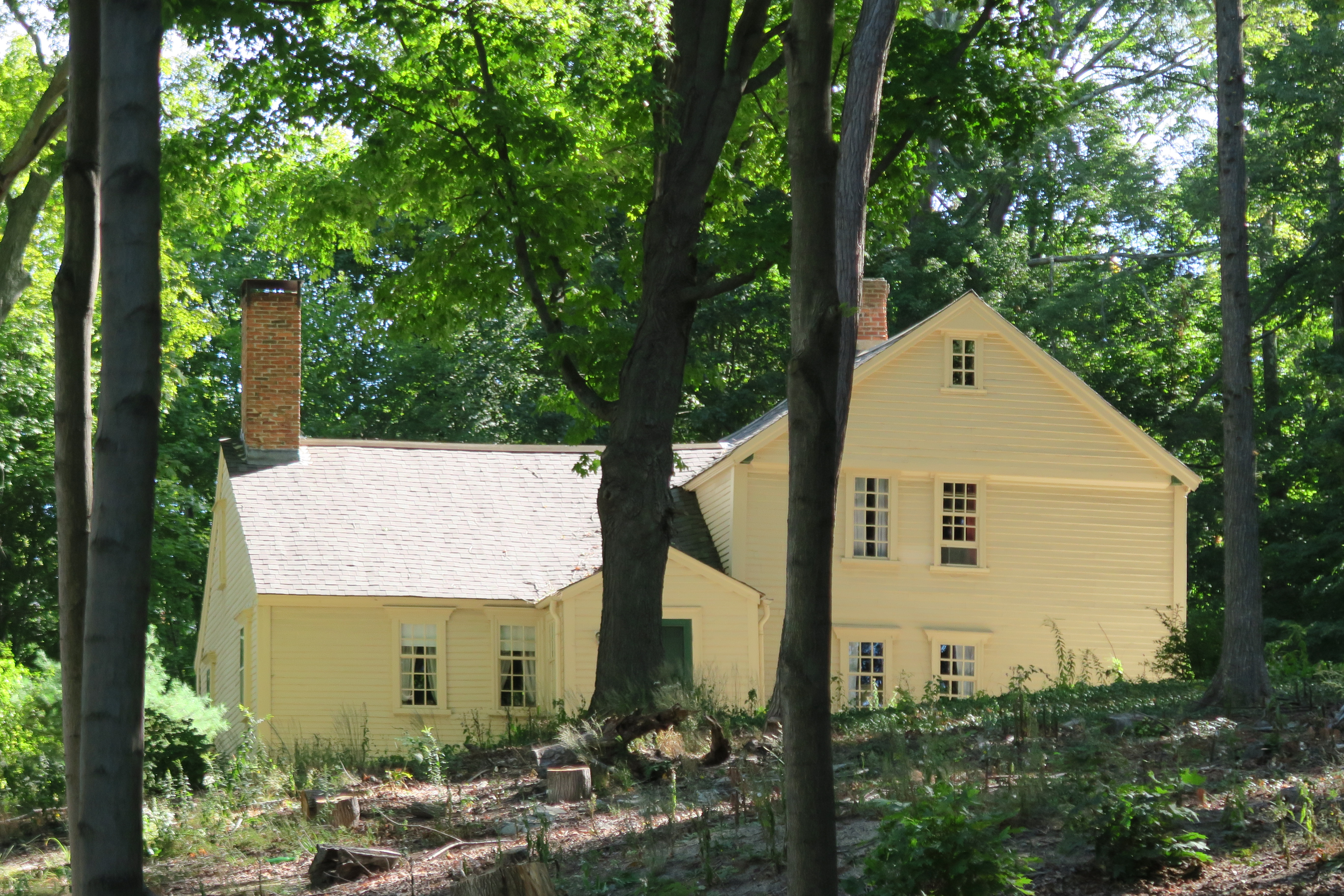
- Faulkner House

- Location within Massachusetts Location within the United States
- Interactive map showing the location of Faulker House
- Location: Acton, Massachusetts
- Coordinates: 42°27′32.5″N 71°27′10.8″W
- Built: 1700
- Architectural style: Colonial
- NRHP reference No.: 71000080
- Added to NRHP: June 13, 1986

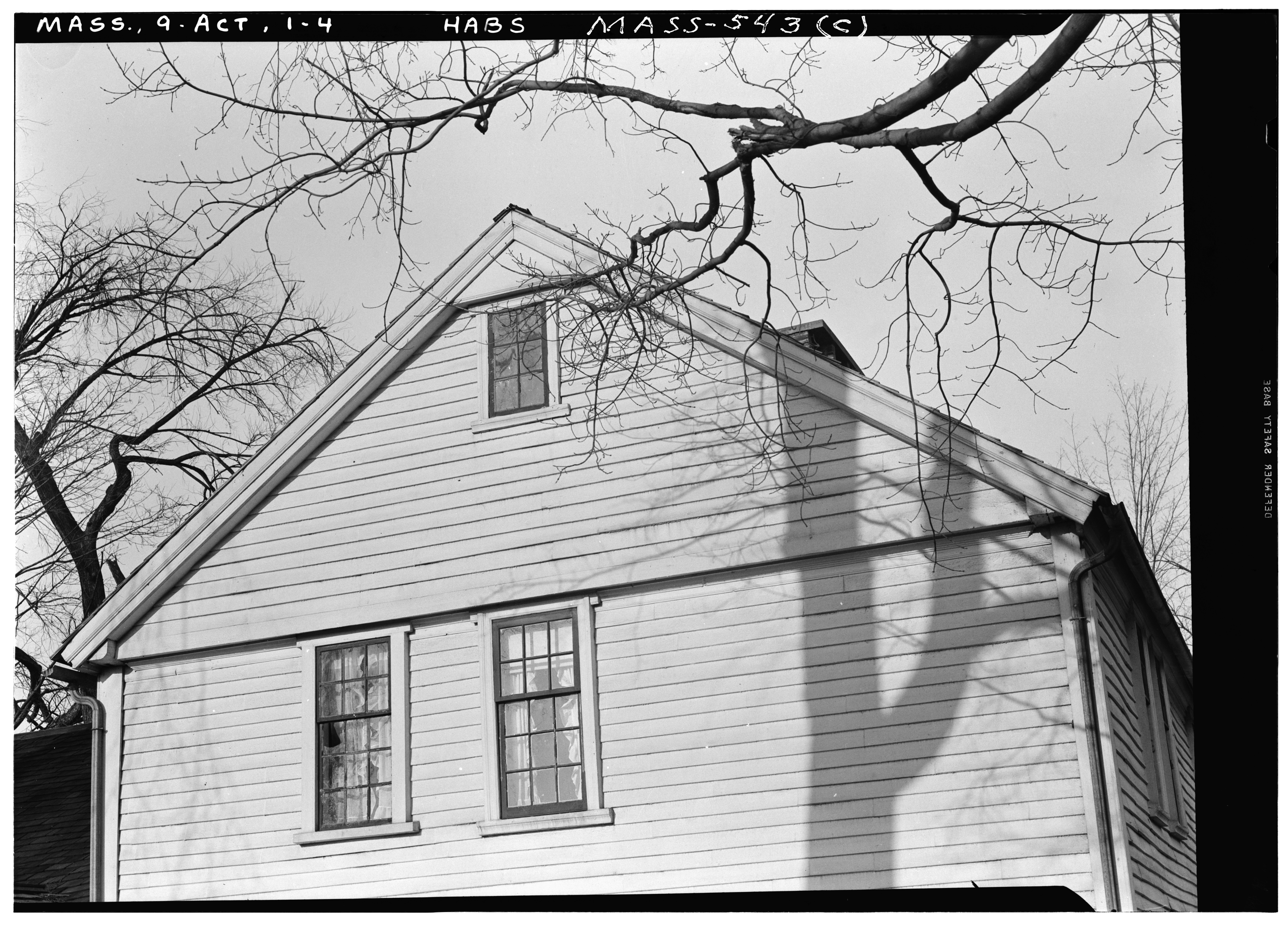
Historic American Buildings Survey Frank O. Branzetti, Photographer April 3, 1941 (c) EXT.- WEST GABLE END, LOOKING UP - Faulkner House, High Street, Acton, Middlesex County, MA

The Faulkner House is the oldest colonial-era structure still standing in Acton, Massachusetts. The Faulkner House was purchased in 1964 by 'Iron Work Farm in Acton, Inc.', a Massachusetts non-profit corporation with a charter "to acquire and preserve the tangible landmarks of the area historically known as Iron Work Farm", now part of Acton. The Faulkner House is now being preserved under its stewardship.

== History ==
The Faulkner house was originally built for Ephraim Jones (1679–1710), the founder in 1702 of an early textile business and other mills that formed the nucleus of the present town of Acton. Being the largest and most central house of this settlement, it served as the local garrison house for protection during Indian raids made along the Massachusetts frontier during Queen Anne's War (1702–1713).

Ammi Ruhamah Faulkner rented the house and mills in 1738, then purchased them in 1742. For 202 years, the Faulkner House was the homestead for six generations of the Faulkner family. The family carried on the processing of woolen cloth at the fulling mill across the road from the house; the mill was said to have been one of the earliest attempts in the United States to manufacture woolen cloth on a large scale.

== American Revolution ==
The Faulkner homestead served as a garrison for the South Acton Militia during the American Revolutionary War. As Paul Revere rode to raise alarm on April 18, 1775, he found that he would need more riders to continue the message. In Lexington, Revere found, and enlisted the help of, Dr. Samuel Prescott. Dr. Prescott was sent to Concord, and then to Acton. Prescott, after informing Captain Joseph Robbins, Isaac Davis, and Deacon Simon Hunt of the news, went to South Acton and then to the Faulkner house. Upon receiving the news, Major Francis Faulkner fired off three shots, the signal alarm, and soon the militia of Acton had assembled at the house. From Acton, a man named Edward Bancroft carried the message on towards Groton and Pepperell.

The Faulkner House and Jones Tavern are two historic properties in South Acton that are owned by Iron Work Farm in Acton, Inc., a non-profit, historical Massachusetts corporation with a charter to study the documents and preserve the tangible landmarks connected with the village of [South] Acton. Exchange Hall is another historic property in South Acton that is in close proximity to both Jones Tavern and the Faulkner House.

== See also ==
- National Register of Historic Places listings in Middlesex County, Massachusetts
