= Jones Tavern =

Historic house in Massachusetts, United States

- U.S. National Register of Historic Places
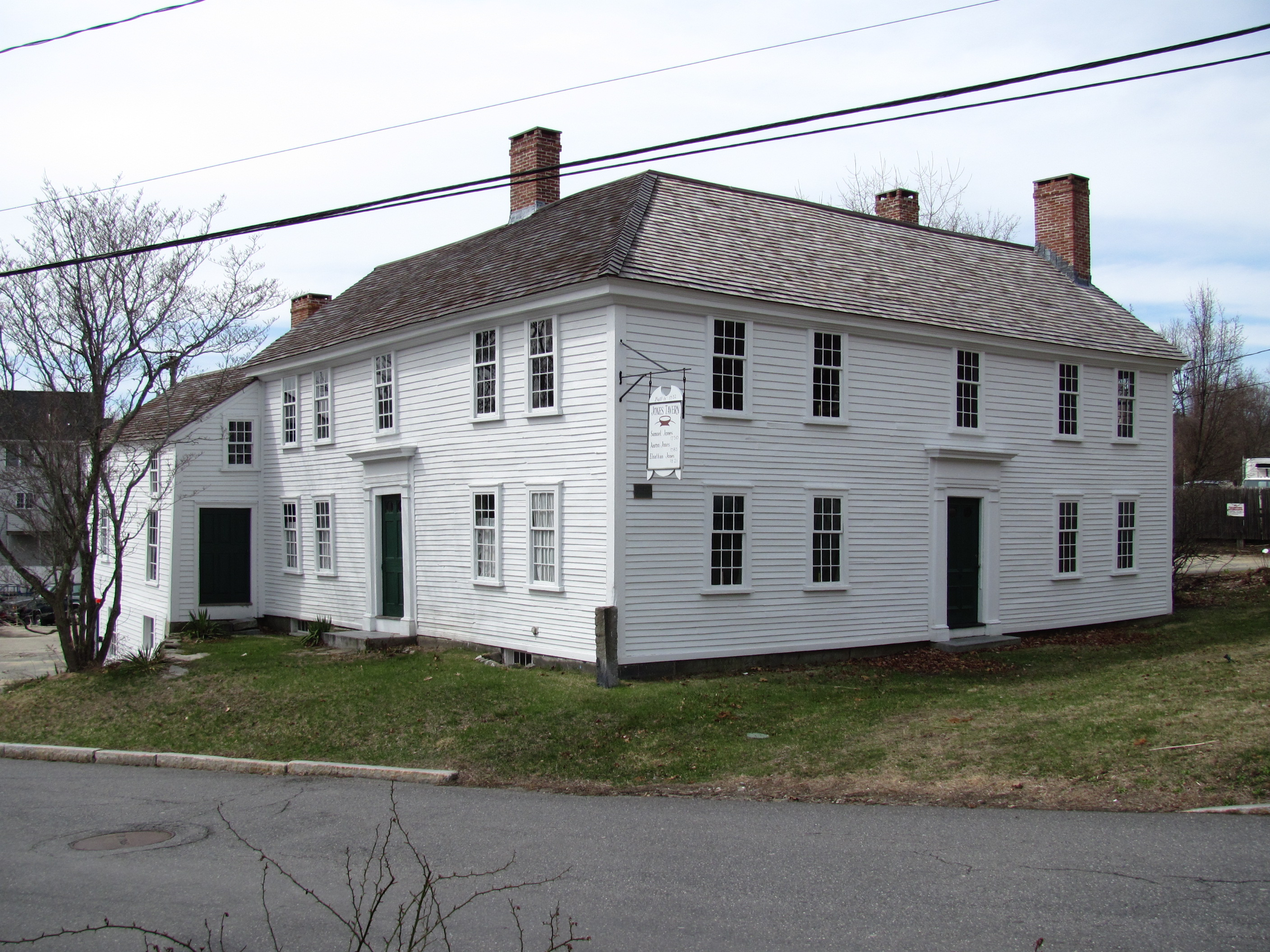
- Jones Tavern

- Location within Massachusetts Location within the United States
- Location: Acton, Massachusetts
- Coordinates: 42°27′38″N 71°27′21″W
- Built: 1732
- Architectural style: Federal
- NRHP reference No.: 86001333
- Added to NRHP: June 13, 1986

Jones Tavern is a historic tavern at 128 Main Street in Acton, Massachusetts.

== History ==
The main part of the tavern was built in 1732 as a home for Samuel Jones Jr. and his family. By 1750, the home had been expanded to become a tavern and general store. It is believed to be the first store in Acton and holds the distinction of being the town of Acton's longest established business. In 1845, the tavern was merged into James Tuttle's store. Tuttle consolidated his businesses in the new Exchange Hall building in 1860. In 1878 Elnathan Jones established a dairy farm on the property, and the building was divided into apartments for farm workers, a role it served until about 1900.

The building was rescued from imminent demolition in 1964 by local residents, who formed Iron Work Farm in Acton, Inc., a Massachusetts non-profit corporation with a charter "to acquire and preserve the tangible landmarks of the area historically known as Iron Work Farm". It was listed on the National Register of Historic Places in 1986.

The Faulkner House and Jones Tavern are two historic properties in South Acton that are owned by Iron Work Farm in Acton, Inc. The tavern is open on the fourth Sunday of each month, from May through October.

== See also ==
- National Register of Historic Places listings in Middlesex County, Massachusetts
