= North Acton Cemetery =

Historic cemetery in Massachusetts, United States

- U.S. National Register of Historic Places
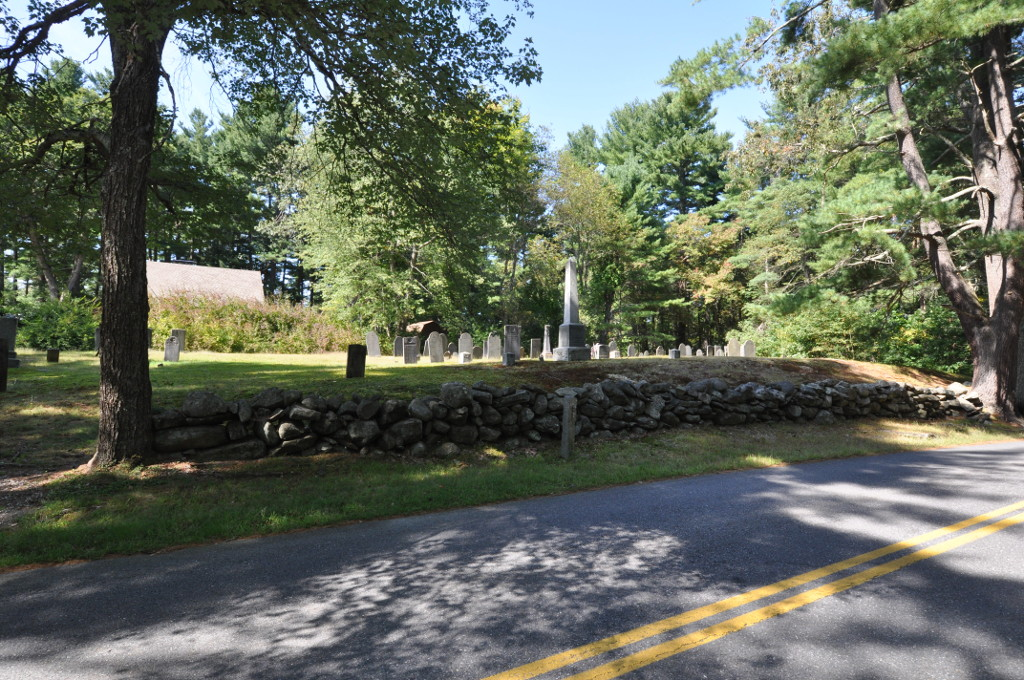

- Location within Massachusetts Location within the United States
- Location: Carlisle Rd. & North St., Acton, Massachusetts
- Coordinates: 42°31′25″N 71°24′1″W
- Area: 0.5 acres (0.20 ha)
- Built: 1758
- NRHP reference No.: 100004269
- Added to NRHP: August 15, 2019

The North Acton Cemetery, also known locally as the Forest Cemetery, is a historic cemetery Carlisle Road and North Street in North Acton, Massachusetts. Established no later than 1737, it is one of the town's oldest burial grounds, and remained in active use into the 20th century. It has more than 100 marked graves. The cemetery was listed on the National Register of Historic Places in 2019.

== Description and history ==
The North Acton Cemetery is located in northern Acton, occupying a roughly rectangular 0.5-acre (0.20 ha) parcel at the northern corner of Carlisle Road and North Street. The cemetery is bounded on all four sides by low fieldstone walls, with the main access through an opening delimited by granite posts on Carlisle Road. There is no formal circulation pattern, with clusters of grave markers scattered across the grounds, which are generally covered in grass or moss. There are 96 marked graves, and 113 known documented burials. Due to the uncertainty of when burials started on the site, there are probably unmarked graves as well.

The cemetery is believed to have been in use no later than 1737, the year in which the town acquired the oldest portion of Woodlawn Cemetery, "the burying ground then in use near Deacon Heald's" being too small and remote for the town's use. This cemetery contains burials of several members of the Heald family, whose 18th-century homstead still stands nearby. The town formally acquired this cemetery in 1760; the oldest marked grave is that of Mary Heald, dated 1758. The cemetery was enlarged in 1811, in part with funding from the neighboring town of Carlisle, some of whose residents were interred here.

In 2014, a sign was made for the site as an Eagle Scout project by Christopher Norton, a member of the Acton Boy Scouts Troop. The sign contains the plot plan with names of those known to have been buried there.

== See also ==
- National Register of Historic Places listings in Middlesex County, Massachusetts
