= Jonathan and Simon Hosmer House =

Historic house in Massachusetts, United States

- U.S. National Register of Historic Places
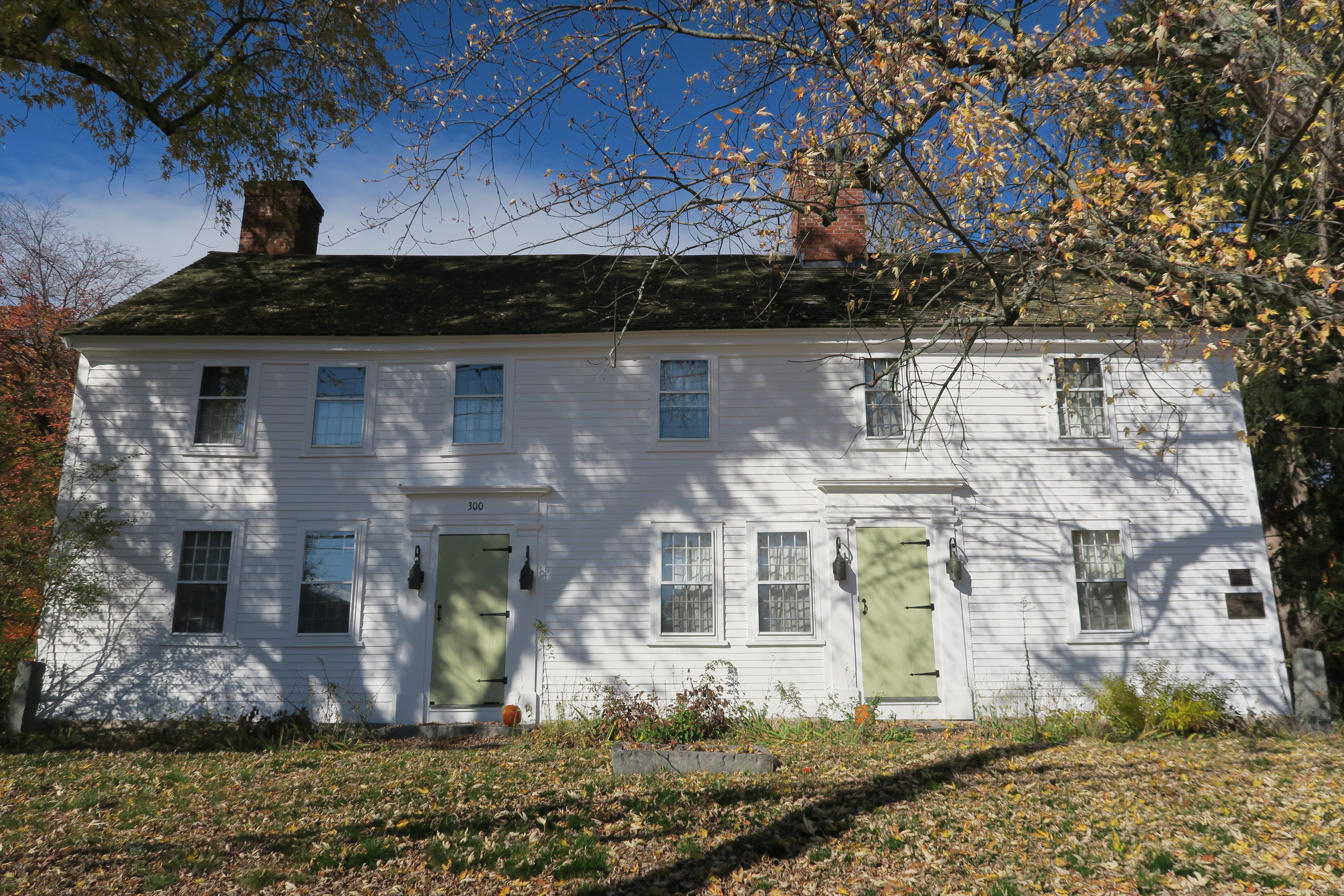
- Jonathan and Simon Hosmer House

- Location within Massachusetts Location within the United States
- Location: Acton, Massachusetts
- Coordinates: 42°28′36″N 71°27′6″W
- Area: 2.7 acres (1.1 ha)
- Built: 1760
- Architect: Hosmer, Jonathan
- Architectural style: Georgian
- NRHP reference No.: 02000432
- Added to NRHP: May 2, 2002

The Jonathan and Simon Hosmer House is a historic house at 300 Main Street in Acton, Massachusetts. The 2 1/2-story wood-frame house was built in 1760, and is one of Acton's best-preserved colonial-era houses. It is an unusual double house, consisting of one section with a square plan, and the other with a typical colonial "half house" plan, having three bays and an off-center chimney. Its two entries are finished with relatively high-style Georgian entries. The house was built by Jonathan Hosmer, Jr., a bricklayer whose workmanship is evident in the house's many fireplaces. Hosmer was also prominent in civic and military affairs; he served (along with his son, who was killed) in the 1777 Battle of Bennington. In the 19th century the house was owned by Francis Tuttle, who owned a dry goods store in the center of town. In 1974 the property was acquired by the Acton Historical Society, which rents one of the units, and operates the rest of the property as a museum.

The house was listed on the National Register of Historic Places in 2002.

== See also ==
- National Register of Historic Places listings in Middlesex County, Massachusetts
