= Acton Centre Historic District =

Historic district in Massachusetts, United States

- Acton Center Historic District
- U.S. National Register of Historic Places
- U.S. Historic district
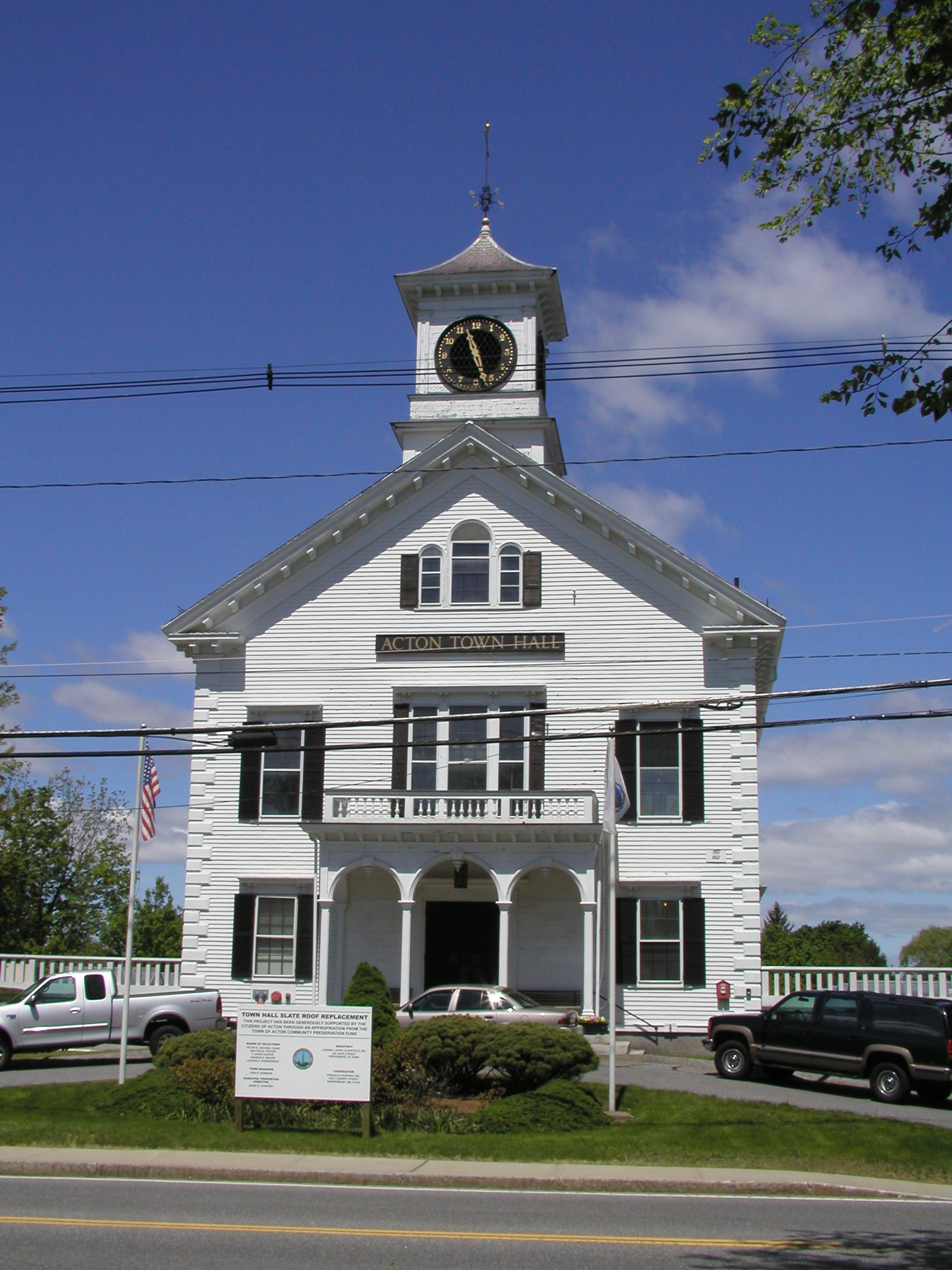

- Location within Massachusetts Location within the United States
- Location: Main St., Wood and Woodbur Lanes, Newton, Concord, and Nagog Hill Rds. Acton, Massachusetts
- Coordinates: 42°29′11″N 71°25′58″W
- Area: 33.5 acres (13.6 ha)
- Architect: Hartwell and Richardson; Taylor, Moses
- Architectural style: Greek Revival, Federal
- NRHP reference No.: 83000780
- Added to NRHP: March 10, 1983

The Acton Center Historic District encompasses the historic heart of the once-rural, now suburban, town of Acton, Massachusetts. The district includes properties on Main Street, Wood and Woodbury Lanes, Newtown, Concord, and Nagog Hill Roads, and has been the town's civic heart since its establishment in the 1730s. It was added to the National Register of Historic Places in 1983.

== Description and history ==
The area that is now Acton was granted to English colonial settlers in 1643, but was not settled until 1680 as part of Concord. It was separately incorporated in 1735. The town's early civic buildings and common area were located near its geographic center, which for much of the colonial period remained a small agricultural settlement. It remained so due to the absence of water power for industrial growth, which led to the growth of West Acton and South Acton. It was also bypassed by the railroad, but retained civic importance due to the presence of churches and civic buildings. Most of the housing stock in Acton Center is Federal or Greek Revival in style, although there are some houses that have later Italianate and Queen Anne styling, and there are several Colonial Revival houses.

The historic district extends along Main Street (Massachusetts Route 27) from the triangular common in the west to Nagog Hill in the east, and includes a few buildings on adjacent roadways. The common is the remnant of the town's original common, established in 1731, and houses the town's monument to the American Revolutionary War. It was here that the town's militia company mustered for the Battles of Lexington and Concord that sparked the conflict. The town's main civic buildings are in the district: the Congregational Church (1846, later restyled with Queen Anne details), the Town Hall (1863, Italianate), and Acton Memorial Library (1889, Romanesque Revival).

== See also ==
- National Register of Historic Places listings in Middlesex County, Massachusetts
