= Nashoba Brook Stone Chamber =

Underground stone chamber in Massachusetts with uncertain origins

Coordinates: 42°30′32″N 71°24′43″W

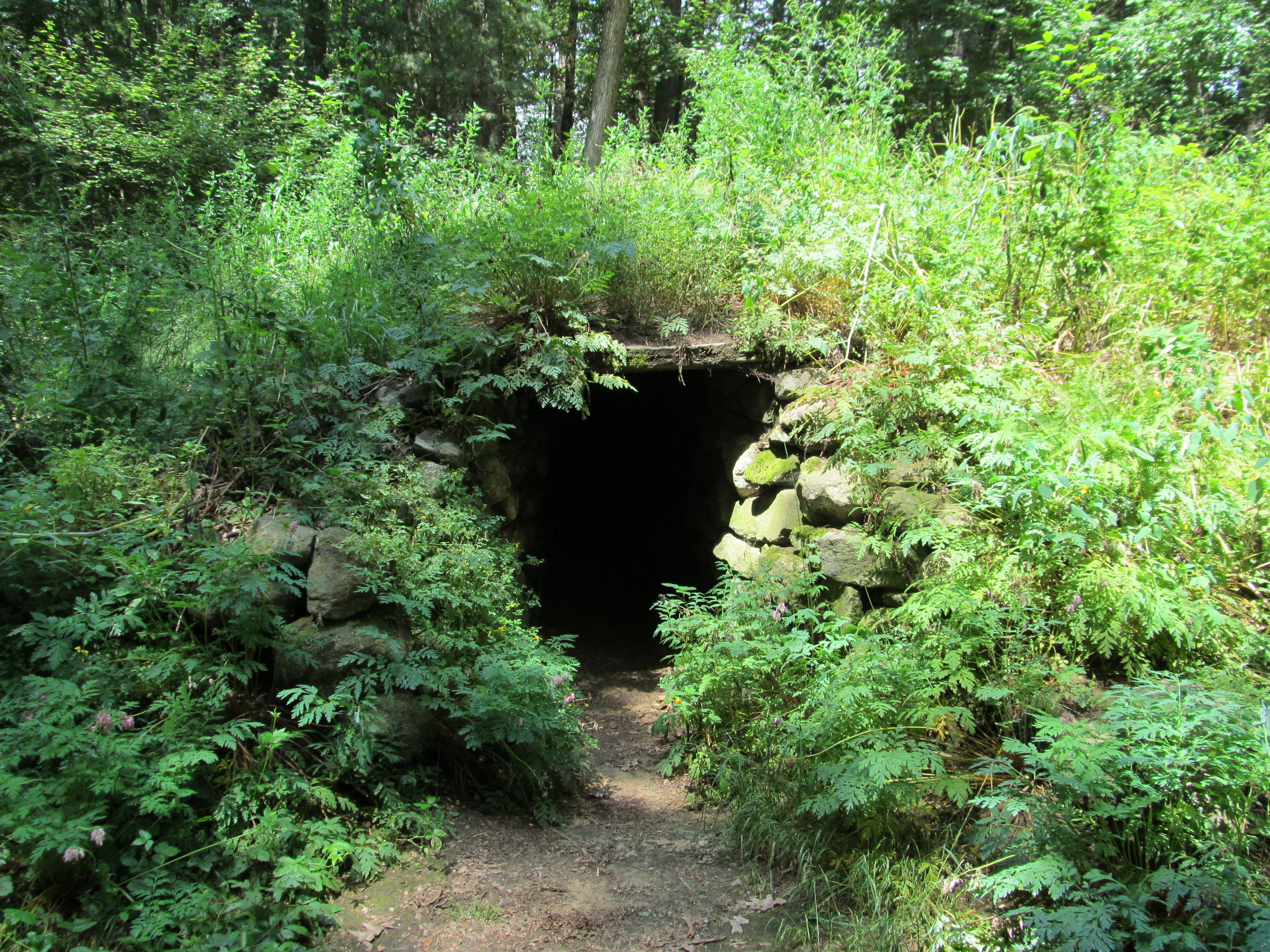
Nashoba Brook Stone Chamber

The Nashoba Brook Stone Chamber is an underground stone structure in the woods of the Nashoba Brook Conservation Area of Acton, Massachusetts. Its more common name is the "potato cave", which comes from the traditional assumption that it was once used as a root cellar. Research and excavation from 2006 supports this assertion, finding evidence of construction from the 18th or 19th century for the purpose of storing food. Some argue that it may originally have been a pre-colonial native American ceremonial stone landscape structure. Local lore states that it also served as shelter for workers on the nearby railroad in the 19th century.

== "Trail Through Time" ==
The restored chamber is due to be part of Acton's Trail Through Time, which was developed to document the settlement and use of North Acton's Nashoba Brook. Besides the stone chamber, other points on the trail include the Pencil Mill and the Wheeler Farm site at the end of Wheeler Lane.
