= Nashoba Brook Pencil Factory Site =

Ruins of a historic factory

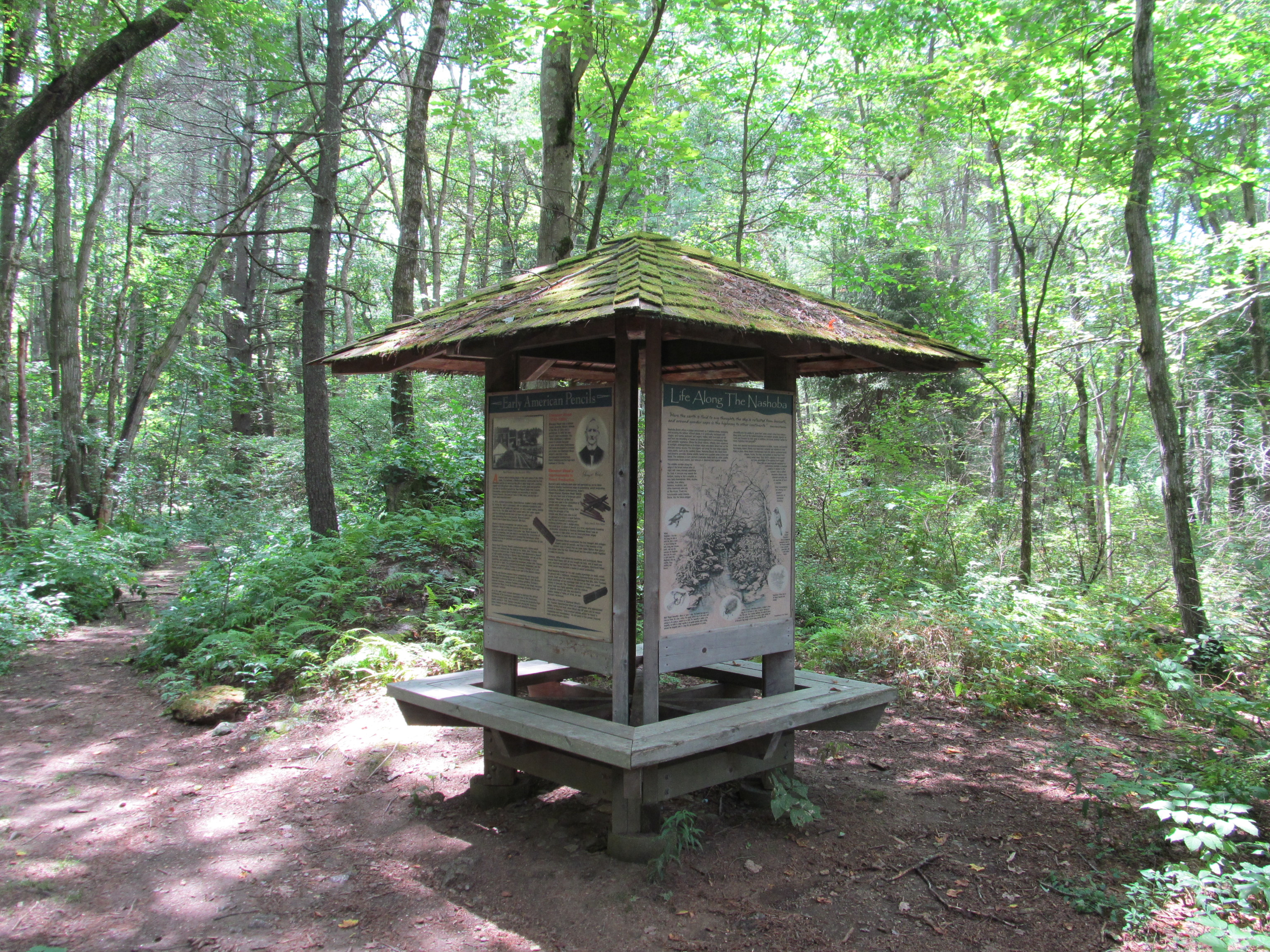
Kiosk Nashoba Brook Pencil Factory Site

The Nashoba Brook Pencil Factory Site contains the ruins of a 19th-century dam-powered pencil factory. This factory was one of several in Acton and Concord, Massachusetts at the time that brought important developments to pencil manufacturing. All that remain today of the factory are the ruins of its dam and a few mechanical components. The site is in the Nashoba Brook Conservation Area in Acton, Massachusetts, along Nashoba Brook and the old Davis Road Dam. Visitors can access the site by following a marked path from the Davis Road parking area for the Nashoba Brook Conservation Area

== 19th century Concord-based pencil industry ==
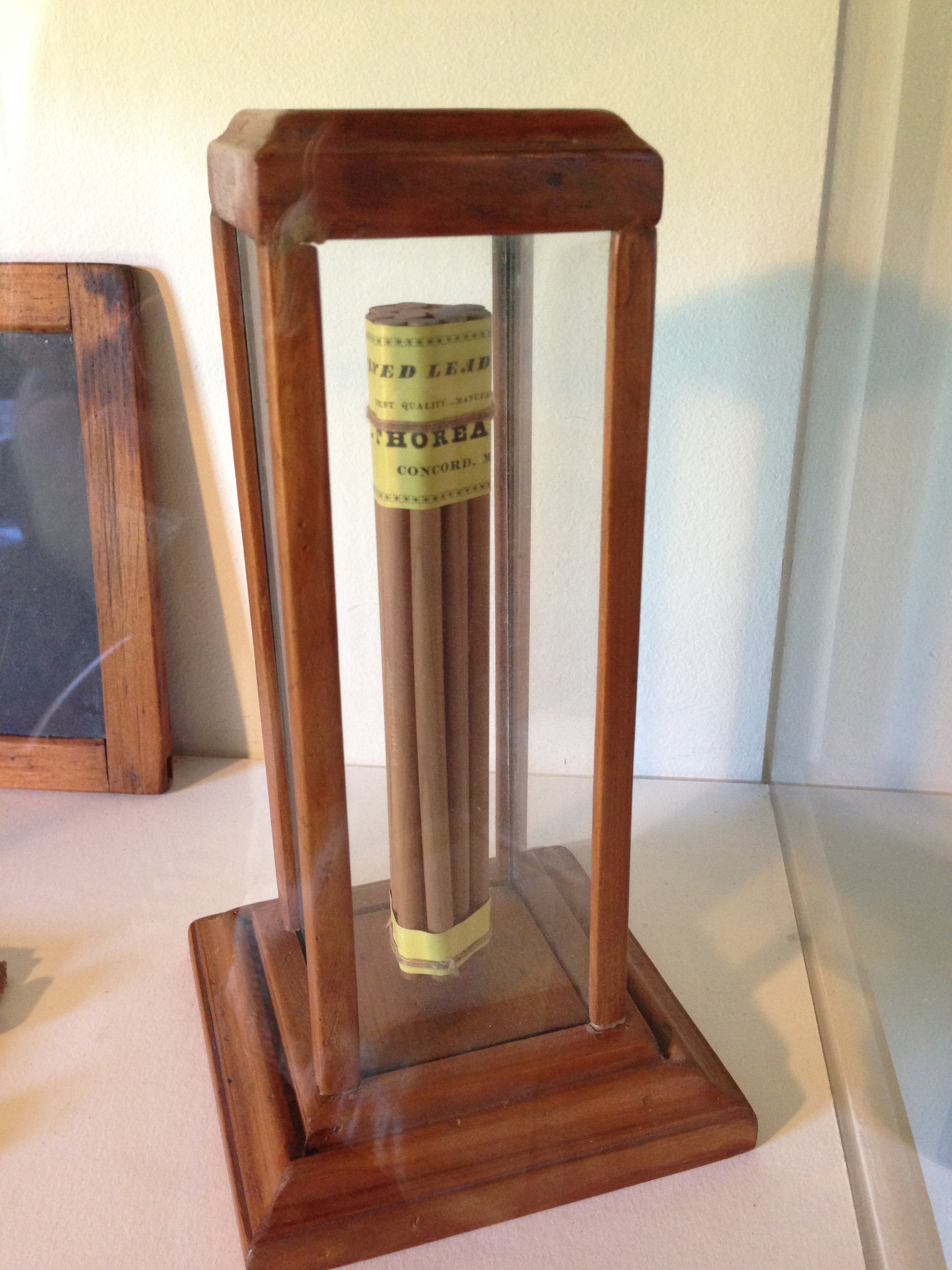
original Thoreau pencils (photographed in 2015)

The American pencil industry started in Concord in the 19th century. In 1812, William Munroe, a Concord-based cabinet maker, became the first American to successfully manufacture and sell wood-encased pencils. Munroe's main competitor later became the Thoreau family pencil business in Concord, run by John Thoreau, father of Henry David Thoreau. John Thoreau's brother-in-law, Charles Dunbar, discovered a deposit of graphite in Bristol, New Hampshire, in 1821. In 1823, Dunbar asked John Thoreau to join him in manufacturing pencils from this graphite. Later, Dunbar left the firm, and it acquired the name John Thoreau & Company. Henry David Thoreau worked at his family's factory for most of his adult life.

== Ebenezer Wood ==
The founder of the factory at this site was Ebenezer Wood (1792–1880). Wood brought several innovations to pencil manufacturing, such as the use of the circular saw and octagonal and hexagonal forms for wood pencil casings. The hexagonal form has since become common for pencils.

Ebenezer Wood was, like Munroe, a cabinet maker. It was perhaps this commonality that brought them together when Munroe hired Wood to help operate his two-man saw for cutting the pencil casings. Eventually, Wood brought additional machinery and automation into Munroe's factory.

Wood then started his own mill for grinding plumbago for the graphite used in pencils. Initially, Munroe was one of his customers. However, by the 1830s, he sold plumbago exclusively to the Thoreau company, a business relation that lasted many years. Henry David Thoreau supposedly purchased his sketch pencils from Wood's factory.

== Nashoba Brook mills ==
This factory was one of several mills that once drew power from Nashoba Brook. The factory was situated on the western edge of the stream closer to the Framingham & Lowell Railroad tracks. The site is currently inaccessible from the Pencil Factory Kiosk and the Nashoba Brook Conservation Area trails. The kiosk does contain a picture of the site circa 1900. The site can be viewed from the newly opened section of the Bruce Freeman Rail Trail. A historical marker and photograph alongside the trail explain the significance of the site, and the contribution of Ebeneezer Wood.

Upstream, on the northern side of the Nashoba Brook Conservation Area, at 42°30′51.2″N 71°24′14.1″W, lies the Robbins Mill Pond Dam, which the town renovated in 1990. Paths that run on either side of Nashoba Brook connect the upstream sites to the Pencil Mill.

Another pencil factory was located downstream at Brook Street (42°29′38.4″N 71°25′12.6″W).

== Trail Through Time ==
The Pencil Factory is due to be part of Acton's Trail Through Time, which is being developed to document the settlement and use of North Acton's Nashoba Brook. Besides the Factory site, other points on the trail will include the Potato Cave and the Wheeler Farm site at the end of Wheeler Lane.

== Timeline ==
1792	Ebenezer Wood born
1812	William Munroe starts manufacturing pencils
1817	Henry David Thoreau born
1821	Charles Dunbar discovers graphite deposit in New Hampshire
1823	John Thoreau starts working with Dunbar
1830s	Wood's mill starts grinding plumbago exclusively for the Thoreau's
1837	Henry David Thoreau returns to Concord from Harvard University
1862	Henry David Thoreau dies
1880	Ebenezer Wood dies
1987	Nashoba Brook Conservation Area opens
1990	Robbins Mill Pond Dam renovated
1999	Jeff LeBlanc builds site kiosk for Eagle Scout project

== See also ==
- Henry David Thoreau
- Pencil
- History of Acton, Massachusetts
