= Acton Memorial Library =

Public library in Acton, Massachusetts, United States

Coordinates: 42.4866°N 71.4334°W

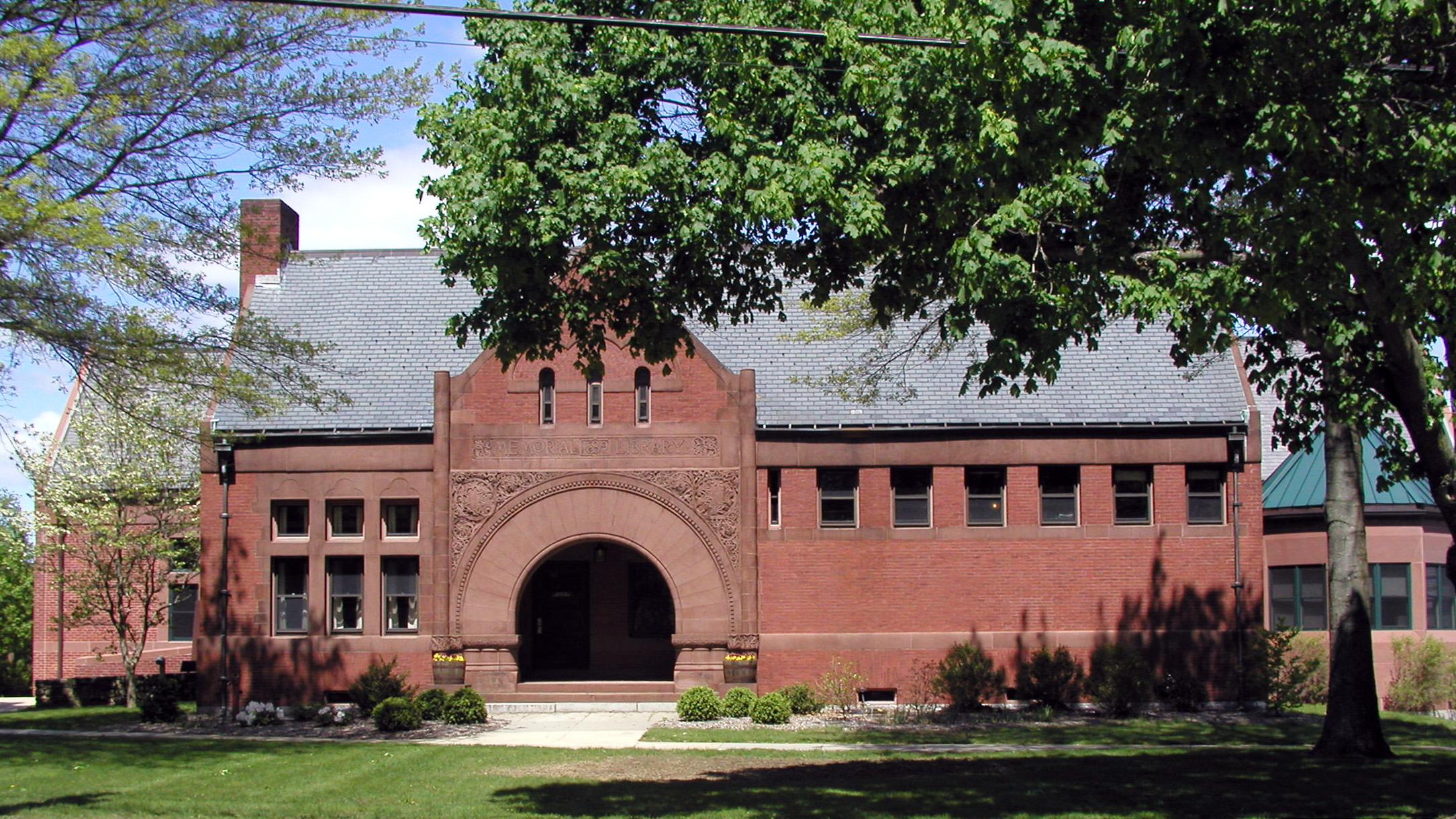
- Location: Acton, Massachusetts, United States of America
- Type: Public Library
- Established: 1890
- Architect: Hartwell and Richardson
- Branches: 2

Access and use
- Population served: 21,929 (2010 census)

Other information
- Website: https://www.actonmemoriallibrary.org/

Acton Memorial Library is a public library at 486 Main Street in Acton, Massachusetts. In 1889 William Allan Wilde (1827–1902), a Sunday school publisher and state legislator who was a native of Acton, donated funds to construct the library to memorialize Acton's citizens who served in the American Civil War. The historic Romanesque Revival library building was constructed in 1890 by the architects Hartwell and Richardson of Boston and contractor, Charles H. Dodge. Large additions were constructed in 1967 and 1996. The library is part of the Minuteman Library Network. It is contributing property in the Acton Centre Historic District.
