= Acton Congregational Church =

Church in Acton, Massachusetts, United States

Coordinates: 42.48513°N 71.432432°W

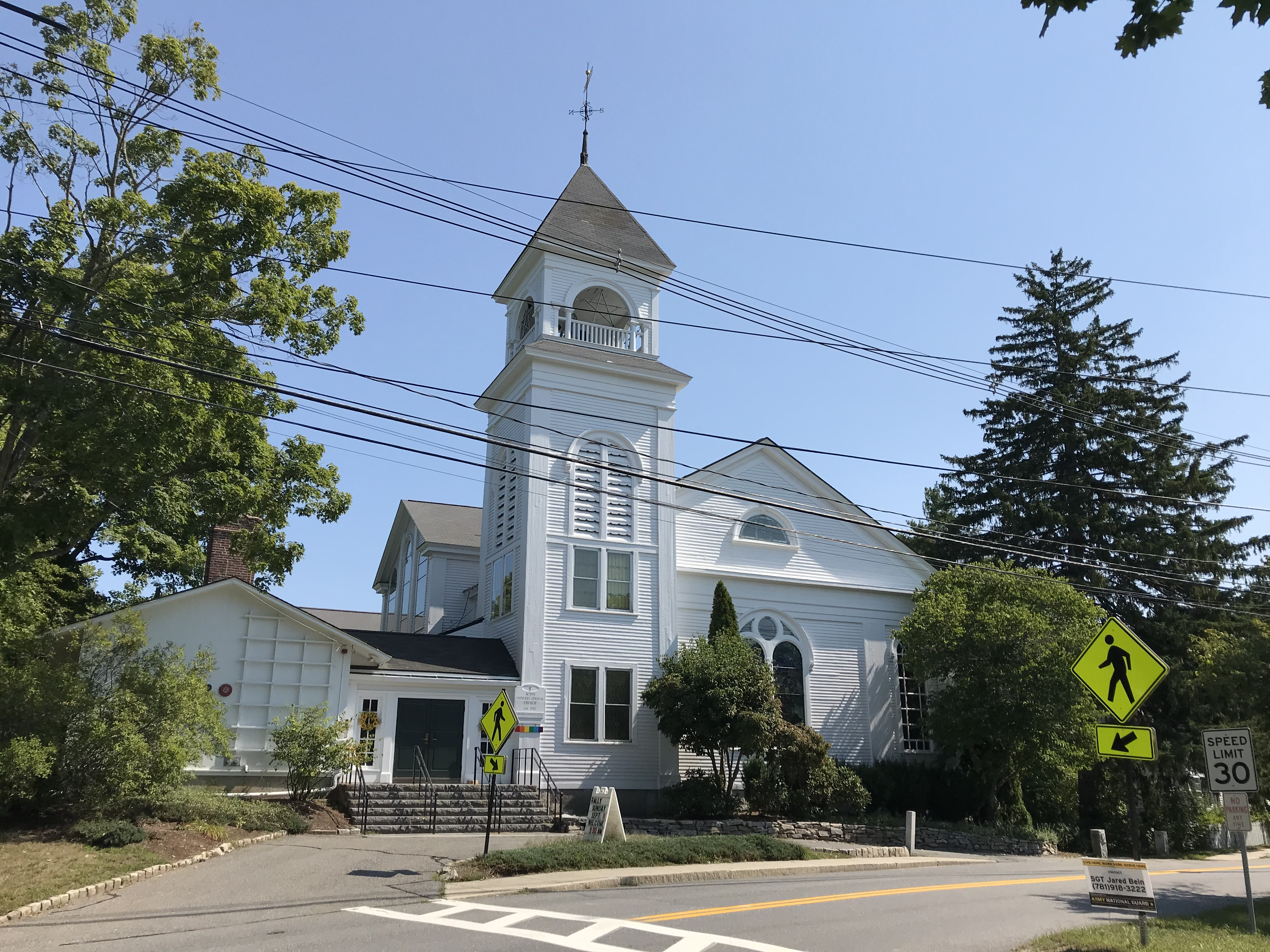
Acton Congregational Church

The Acton Congregational Church is a mid-19th century, white clapboard, church building and active congregation in Acton, Massachusetts that become the center of national attention in 2018 when a case decided by the Massachusetts Supreme Judicial Court ruled that churches cannot receive public funds to support religious activities.

In 2016 the Acton Town Meeting approved a Community Preservation Act bundle of grants with a total of $51,237; $49,500 for the purpose of develop a master plan to restore and preserve the Church's building and two adjacent mid-19th century houses that it rents out, the remainder of the funds to be used to restore the Church's stained glass windows. The Washington, D.C. based Americans United for Separation of Church and State brought suit alleging that the grant violates the Anti-Aid Amendment of the Massachusetts Constitution.
