= William Allan Wilde =

American publisher and politician (1827–1902)

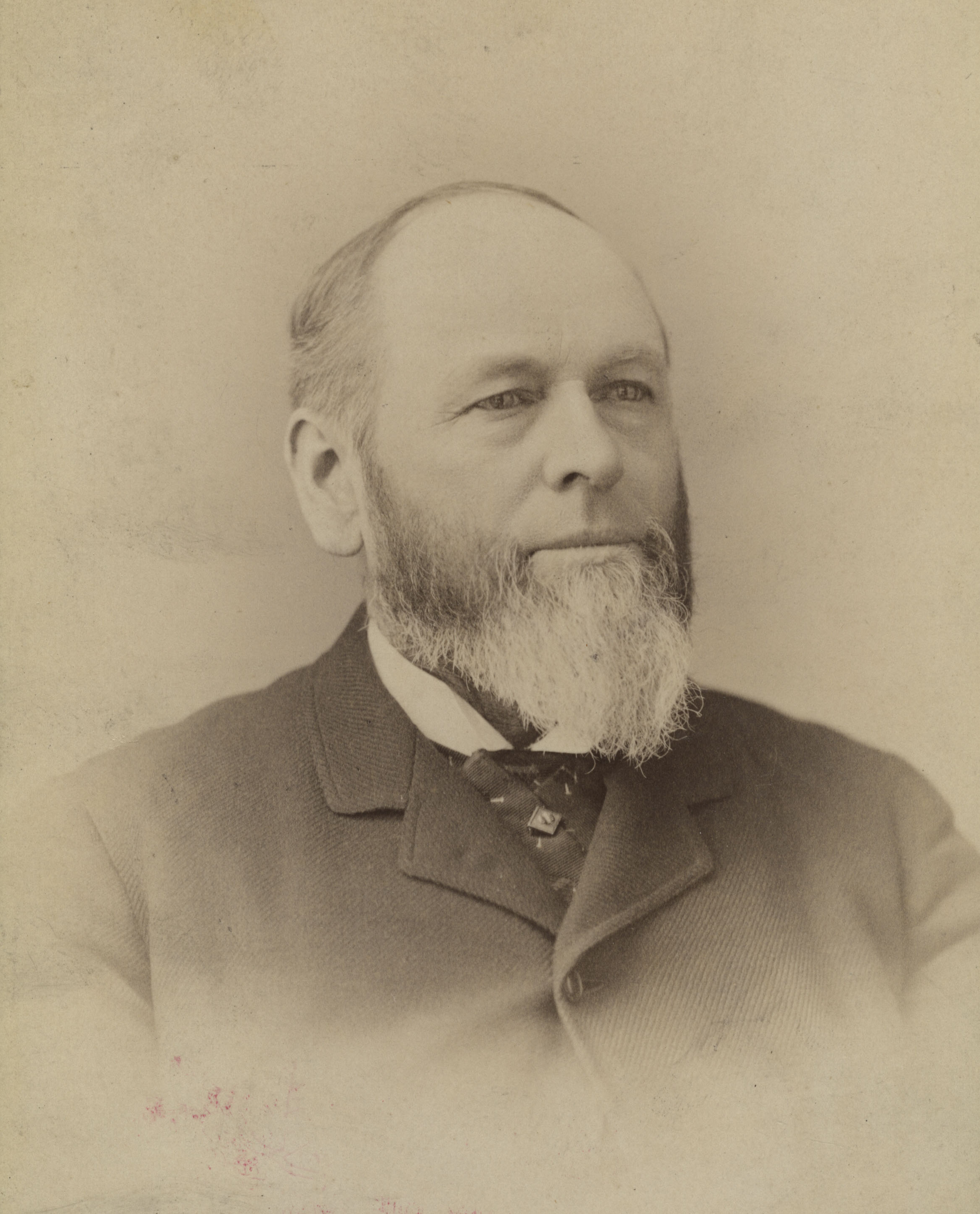

Member of the Massachusetts House of Representatives from the 9th Middlesex district
- In office 1887–1888

Personal details
- Born: July 11, 1827 Acton, Massachusetts, US
- Died: December 2, 1902 (aged 75) Malden, Massachusetts, US
- Resting place: Woodlawn Cemetery
- Party: Republican
- Occupation: Publisher, educator, politician

William Allan Wilde (July 11, 1827 – December 2, 1902) was an American publisher, educator, and politician who served in the Massachusetts House of Representatives from 1887 to 1888. He donated land and funds with which to build the Acton Memorial Library, in commemoration of Acton's citizens who served in the Union army.

== Life and career ==
Wilde was born in Acton, Massachusetts, on July 11, 1827, to Joseph Wilde and Sarah Conant Wilde. He attended Lawrence Academy in Groton, Massachusetts. Starting in 1847, he worked as a schoolteacher for 12 years before changing careers and working in the schoolbook publishing industry. He ran the New York City-based firm Ivison, Blakeman, Taylor & Company, a textbook publisher. In 1868, he became a founding partner in the Boston-based firm Wilde, Bowler & Company, which published and sold textbooks, office supplies, and luxury stationery. He took over the firm full-time in late 1870 and renamed it W. A. Wilde & Company. The firm specialized in Sunday school books and juvenile literature, including many series. Wilde served as president of the company for the rest of his life, and his sons inherited the business after his death.

Wilde served one term in the Massachusetts House of Representatives from 1887 to 1888, representing the Middlesex County's 9th district as a Republican. He chaired the state prison commission from 1889 to 1894 and at various times served as the school superintendent, the water commission chair, and a trustee of the hospital and public library in Malden, Massachusetts, where he lived. In 1888, he donated land and funds to build the Acton Memorial Library, in honor of his hometown's Union army veterans.

Wilde died of a stroke at his home in Malden, Massachusetts, on December 2, 1902, at the age of 75. His wife and three children survived him. He was buried at Woodlawn Cemetery in Everett, Massachusetts.
