= Exchange Hall =

- U.S. National Register of Historic Places
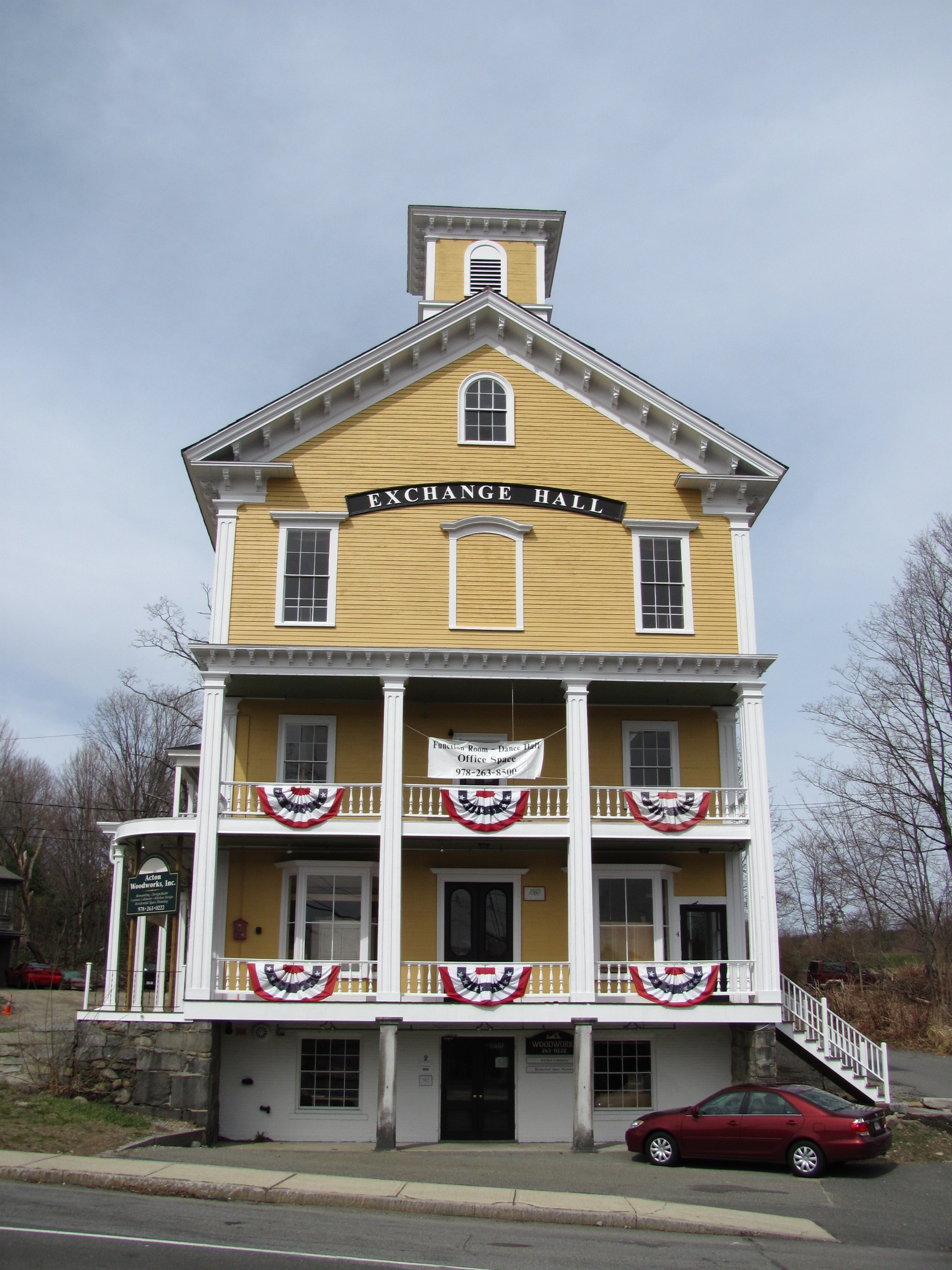
- After renovations, March 2010

- Location within Massachusetts Location within the United States
- Location: Acton, Massachusetts
- Coordinates: 42°27′38.6″N 71°27′15.7″W
- Built: 1860
- Architectural style: Italianate
- NRHP reference No.: 86001327
- Added to NRHP: June 13, 1986

The Exchange Hall is a historic Italianate style hall on Quimby Square, at the intersection of Main and School Streets in the village of South Acton, in Acton, Massachusetts. The 3 1/2-story wood-frame building was built in 1860 by James Tuttle, who ran a dry goods business. The third floor of the building was an open space used for civic, social, and religious functions. During the 20th century, the building housed the South Acton branch of the local public library.

The building was listed on the National Register of Historic Places in 1986. The building currently serves as an event venue and dance studio through Magenta Dance Place.

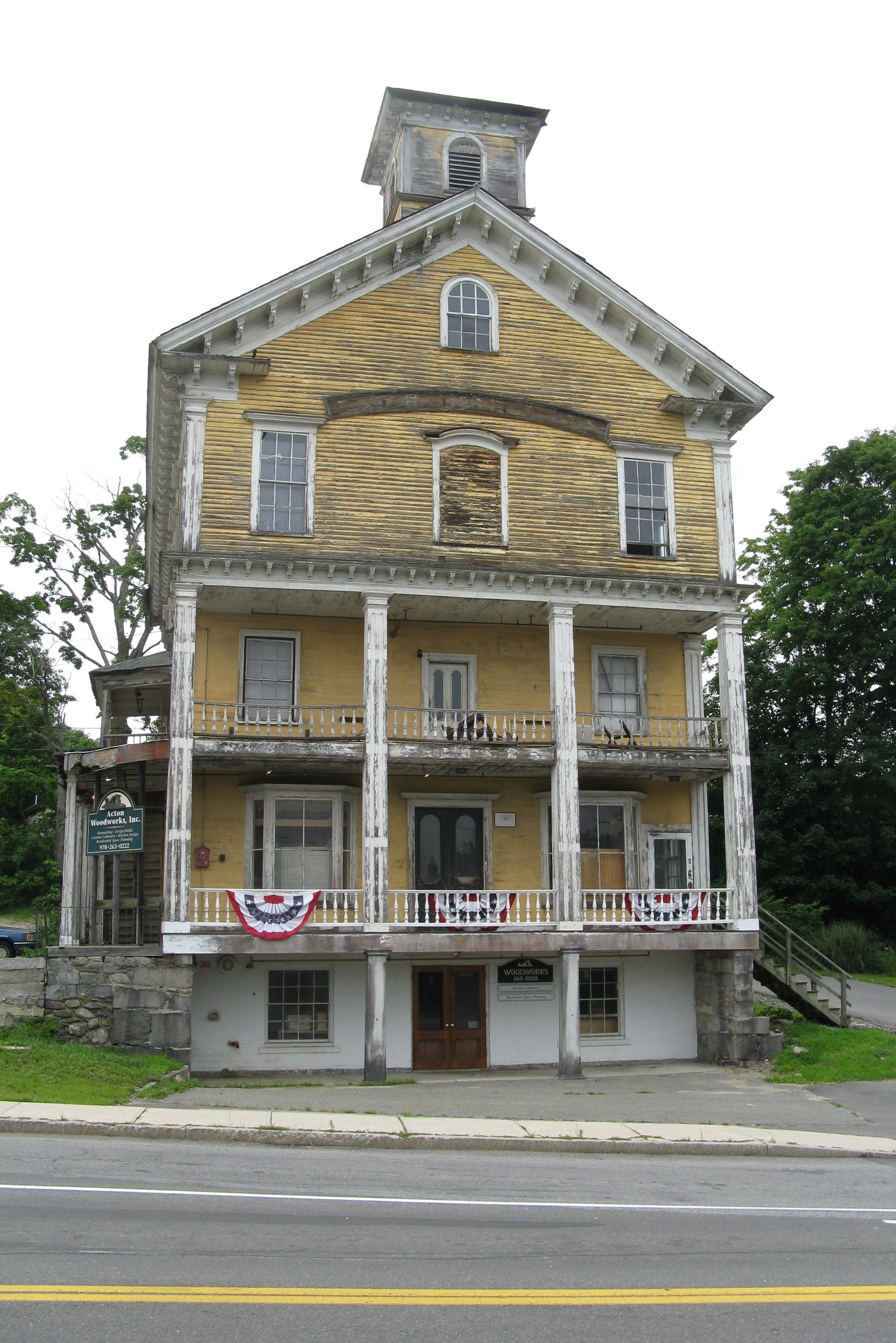
Before renovations, July 2008

== See also ==
- National Register of Historic Places listings in Middlesex County, Massachusetts
