= Acton, Massachusetts =

- Town
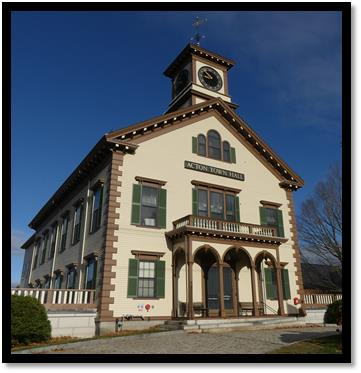
- Acton Town Hall

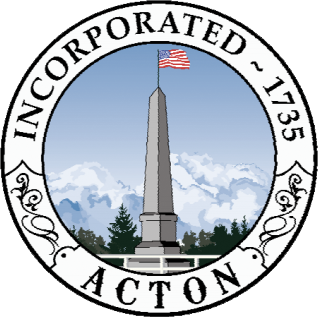
- Seal

- Location in Middlesex County, Massachusetts

- Location within Massachusetts Location within the United States Location within North America
- Coordinates: 42°29′06″N 71°26′00″W
- Country: United States
- State: Massachusetts
- County: Middlesex
- Settled: 1639
- Incorporated: 1735

Government
  - Type: Open town meeting
  - Town Manager: John S. Mangiaratti
  - Select Board: Francesca Arsenault, Chair; Dean A. Charter, Vice-Chair; Alissa Nicol, Clerk; David D. Martin, Member; Jim Snyder-Grant, Member

Area
  - Total: 20.3 sq mi (52.5 km^{2})
  - Land: 20.0 sq mi (51.7 km^{2})
  - Water: 0.31 sq mi (0.8 km^{2})
- Elevation: 259 ft (79 m)

Population (2020)
  - Total: 24,021
  - Density: 1,203/sq mi (464.6/km^{2})
- Time zone: UTC−5 (Eastern)
  - Summer (DST): UTC−4 (Eastern)
- ZIP Codes: 01720 and 01718
- Area codes: 978, 351
- FIPS code: 25-00380
- GNIS feature ID: 0618213
- Website: www.actonma.gov

Acton is a town in Middlesex County, Massachusetts, United States, approximately 21 miles (34 km) west-northwest of Boston along Massachusetts Route 2 west of Concord and about ten miles (16 km) southwest of Lowell. The population was 24,021 in April 2020, according to the United States Census Bureau. It is bordered by Westford and Littleton to the north, Concord and Carlisle to the east, Stow, Maynard, and Sudbury to the south and Boxborough to the west. Acton became an incorporated town in 1735. The town employs the Open Town Meeting form of government with a town manager and an elected, five-member select board.

Acton was named the 11th Best Place To Live among small towns in the country by Money Magazine in 2015, and the 16th best in 2009 and in 2011. The local high school, Acton-Boxborough Regional High School, was named a Blue Ribbon School by the U.S. Department of Education in 2009. The town is also a member of Minuteman Technical Vocational Regional School District. Minuteman was recognized as a National Blue Ribbon School by the Department of Education in 2018. Minuteman was recognized as a National Green Ribbon School by Department of Education in 2024

== Geography ==
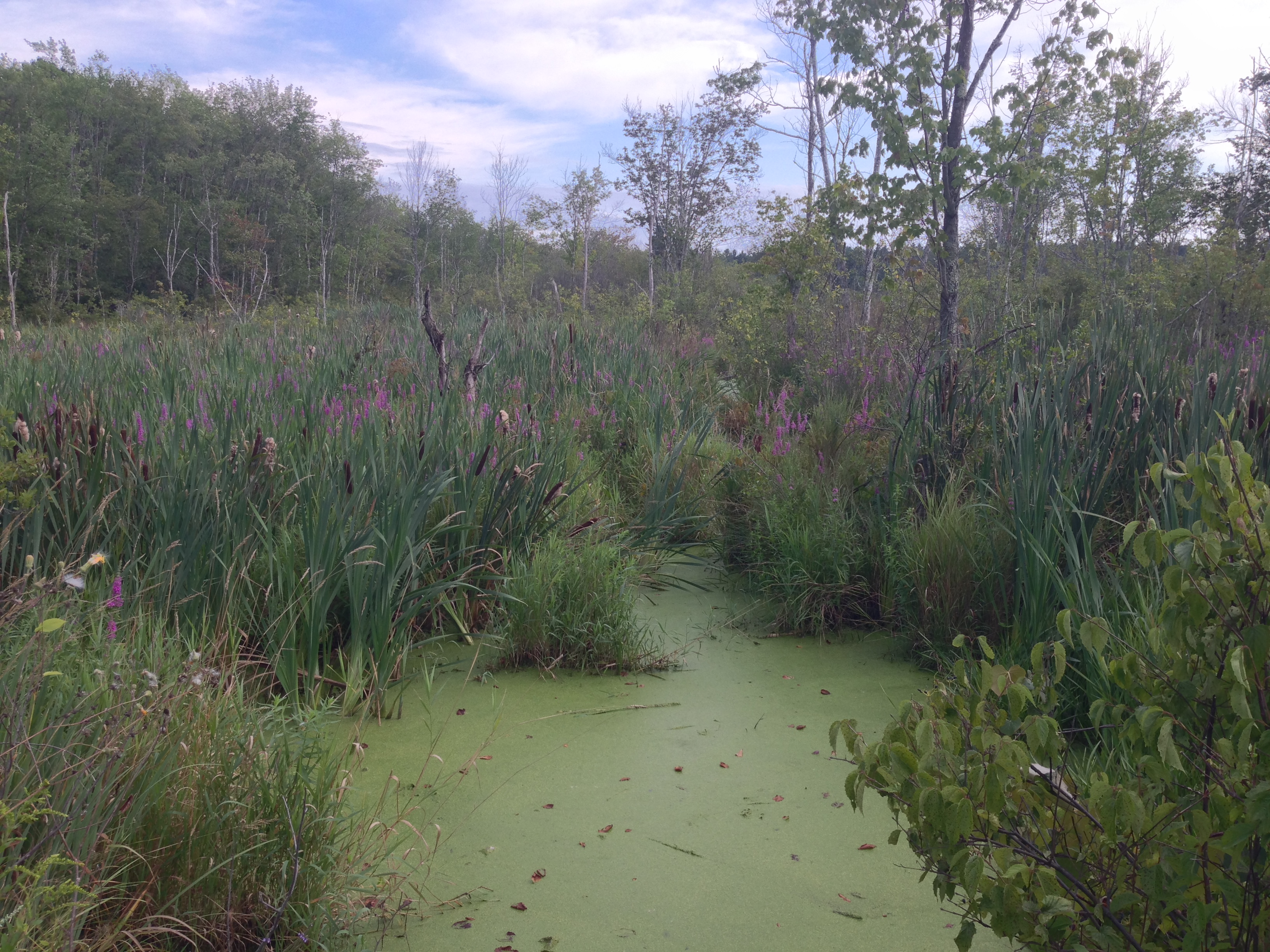
Wetlands in Acton off of Massachusetts Avenue, in summer 2015

Acton is located at 42°29′N 71°27′W. According to the United States Census Bureau, the town has a total area of 20.3 square miles (53 km^{2}), of which 20.0 square miles (52 km^{2}) is land and 0.3 square miles (0.78 km^{2}), or 1.53 percent, is water. Almost all of Acton is forested, except for where it has been cleared for residential or agricultural use. Some forested areas have been put aside for special use by corporations.

The current geography of Acton was created when the last wave of glaciers retreated approximately ten thousand years ago. Acton has nine drumlins—hills which are composed of glacial till. In addition, Wills Hole and Grassy Pond are kettle ponds which were formed in depressions in the till formed by large blocks of ice.

Acton has two primary stream systems: the Nashoba Brook system including the incoming streams Butter Brook, Wills Hole Brook and Conant Brook and the Fort Pond Brook system including the incoming streams Guggins Brook, Inch Brook, Grassy Pond Brook, Pratt's Brook and Coles Brook. Both stream systems empty into the Assabet River, which passes briefly through the town at its southern corner. Nagog Pond in the north, forms Acton's border with the Town of Littleton and provides drinking water to the Town of Concord. A small artificial pond is at NARA Park in North Acton.

=== The five village centers ===
While Acton Center has been the civic center of the town since the revolution, the four other village centers earned their nomenclature from the names of their corresponding railroad station.

- Acton Center is the civic center of the town and is the site of the town hall, the main public library (Acton Memorial Library), a children's playground, an obelisk monument commemorating Acton deaths in "the Concord Fight" of the Revolutionary War, a fire station, the Acton Congregational Church, a 64-acre (260,000 m^{2}) arboretum and conservation area, and the former post office. The modern post office and the police station are each located about one-half mile away in opposite directions along Main Street. Otherwise, Acton Center is generally a residential area.
- West Acton is an important commercial area of town, consisting of several commercial developments centered along Route 111. It developed in response to the growth of the Fitchburg Railroad in the 19th century.

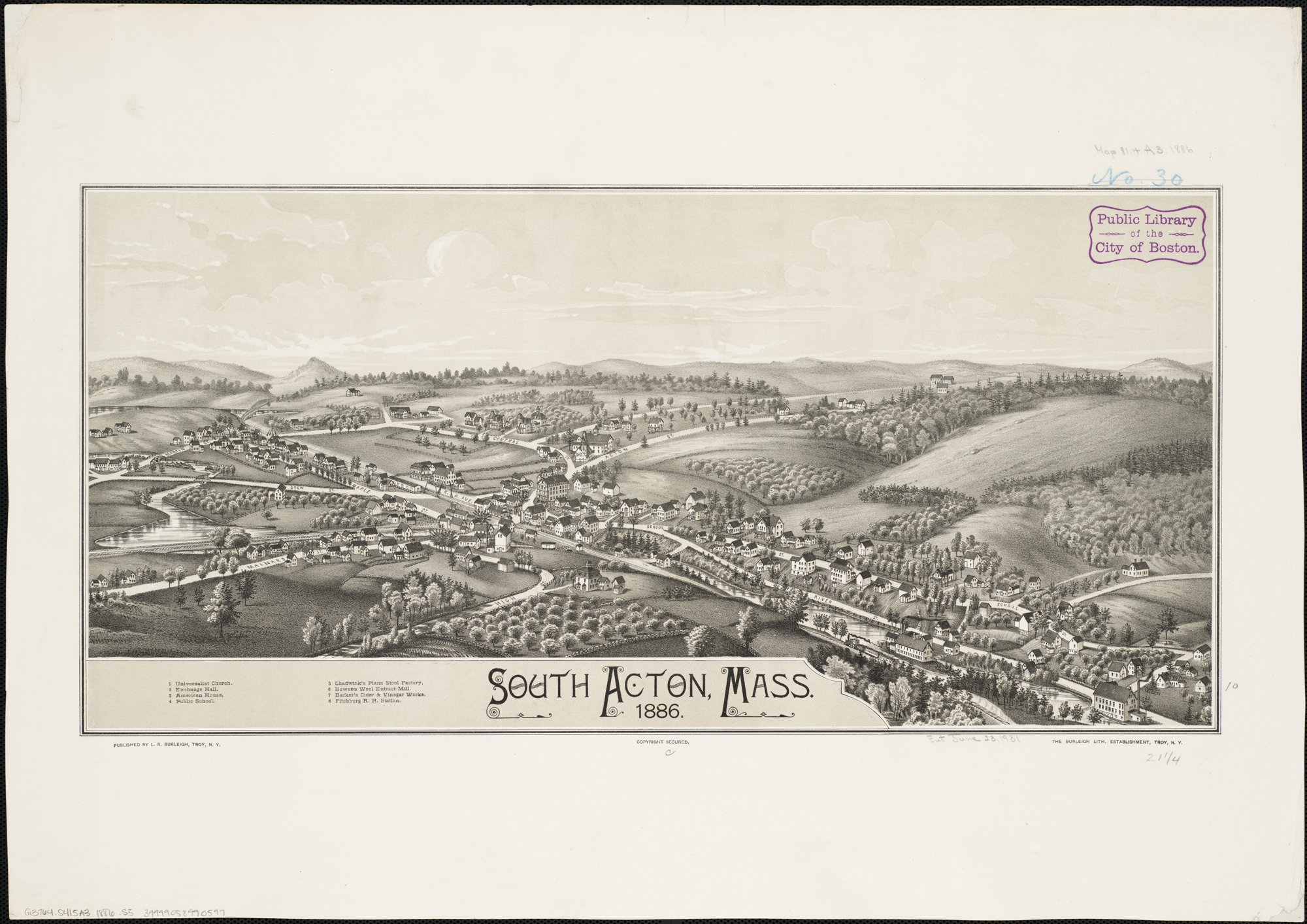
Lithograph of South Acton from 1886 by L.R. Burleigh with list of landmarks

- South Acton used to be the most industrialized area of the town of Acton. In the 18th century, this area held many mills and other small industrial developments that used water power generated by Fort Pond Brook. The area includes the Faulkner Homestead ('Faulkner House'), the oldest home still standing in Acton (dating back to 1707). The Faulkner Homestead was owned by the Faulkner family who also owned and ran a mill across the street. Jones Tavern is another still-standing revolutionary-era structure in South Acton that is listed on the National Register of Historic Places. The South Acton station is the only rail station on the MBTA's Fitchburg Line that remains active in Acton.
- East Acton was originally a small commercial area that grew up around the East Acton train station in the 19th century. With the advent of the automobile, and the demise of this branch of the railroad, East Acton became a largely residential area with a commercial base that is situated along the Route 2A corridor.
- North Acton has had major growth in the period since 1975–1980. With the growth of the Route 2A/119 corridor, North Acton has developed many commercial complexes and condominium buildings. The Nathaniel Allen Recreation Area (also called NARA Park and originally North Acton Recreation Area) contains a small swimming pond, an open-air auditorium, playing fields, and paved walking trail. North Acton also includes the Village of Nagog Woods, a housing development accessible from Route 2A/119 which is large enough to merit its own ZIP code: 01718.

The current Master Plan for the town encourages development in the village centers in an attempt to prevent further sprawl and preserve open space in the rest of the town.

== Demographics ==
Historical population
Year	Pop.	±%
1790	853	—
1850	1,685	+97.5%
1860	1,726	+2.4%
1870	1,593	−7.7%
1880	1,797	+12.8%
1890	1,897	+5.6%
1900	2,120	+11.8%
1910	2,136	+0.8%
1920	2,162	+1.2%
1930	2,482	+14.8%
1940	2,701	+8.8%
1950	3,510	+30.0%
1960	7,238	+106.2%
1970	14,770	+104.1%
1980	17,544	+18.8%
1990	17,872	+1.9%
2000	20,331	+13.8%
2010	21,924	+7.8%
2020	24,021	+9.6%
2025*	24,786	+3.2%
* = population estimate. Source: United States census records and Population Estimates Program data.

According to the 2020 census, there were 24,021 residents, a 9.6% increase from 2010. The population density was 1,209.2 inhabitants per square mile (466.9/km^{2}), up from 1103.6. There were 8,931 households, up from 8,187.

In the 2010 Census of 8,187 households, 42.7% had children under the age of eighteen living with them, 63.5% were husband-wife married couples living together. 23.0% of all households were occupied by individuals 65 years of age or older living alone. The age distribution of the population was 29.5% under the age of 18, 4.3% from 18 to 24, 31.5% from 25 to 44, 26.4% from 45 to 64, and 8.4% 65 years of age or older. The median age was 38 years. For every 100 females, there were 97.2 males. For every 100 females age eighteen and over, there were 94.2 males. For those age 25 years or older in Acton during the 2000 census, 97.2% had a high school degree or higher, 72.0% had a bachelor's degree or higher, and 40.5% had a graduate degree or higher. Also, 98.0% were employed with a mean commute time of 31.0 minutes.

The 2020 median income for a household in the town was $138,163, up from $133,532. In 2010 males had a median income of $109,371 versus $48,113 for females. The 2020 per capita income for the town was $65,952. About 3.3% of the population were below the poverty line, up from 2.9% in 2010.

Race/ethnicity	2020	2010	2000
Non-Hispanic White	63.4%	77.3%	88.3%
Asian	23.7%	18.6%	9.1%
Two or more races	5.7%	1.7%	NR
Black	4.2%	1.1%	0.8%
Hispanic or Latino (of any race)	3.5%	2.6%	1.8%
Native American	0.2%	0.1%	0.1%

=== Chinese and foreign-born populations ===
Acton had 2,041 Chinese Americans in 2010, a 151% increase from 2000 and the ninth largest Chinese population in Massachusetts.

In 2014, 25% of the residents of Acton were born outside of the United States. In 2000 this percentage was 14%.

=== Income ===
Data is from the 2009–2013 American Community Survey 5-Year Estimates.

Rank	ZIP Code (ZCTA)	Per capita income	Median household income	Median family income	Population	Number of households
1	01718 (Nagog Woods)	$62,059	$132,981	$145,750	343	167
	Acton	$53,379	$110,592	$144,946	22,291	8,479
2	01720	$53,152	$109,578	$144,561	21,804	8,265
	Middlesex County	$42,861	$82,090	$104,032	1,522,533	581,120
	Massachusetts	$35,763	$66,866	$84,900	6,605,058	2,530,147
	United States	$28,155	$53,046	$64,719	311,536,594	115,610,216

== History ==
Acton's history reflects the history of Massachusetts, New England, and the United States. It was first settled by Native Americans who used the Assabet, Sudbury and Concord rivers for transportation and the fields for farming seasonal crops. There is evidence of Native American settlements in Acton which go back 7,000 years. When the colonists arrived in this area, the Native American population dropped dramatically due to European diseases for which they had no immunity.

=== Colonization Era through Revolutionary Era ===
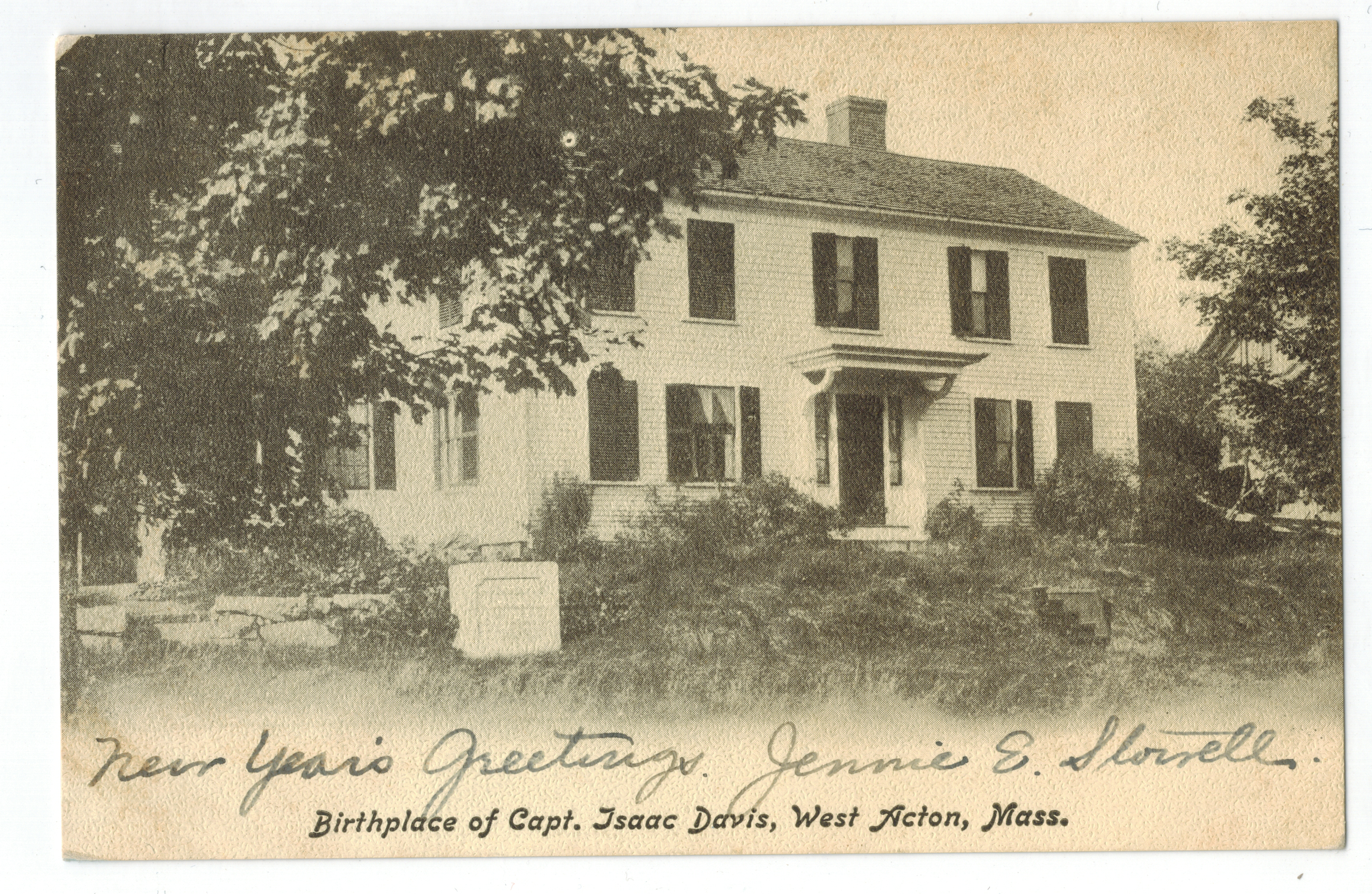
Isaac Davis' birth house in Acton, Massachusetts in 1905 (left) and 2015 (right)

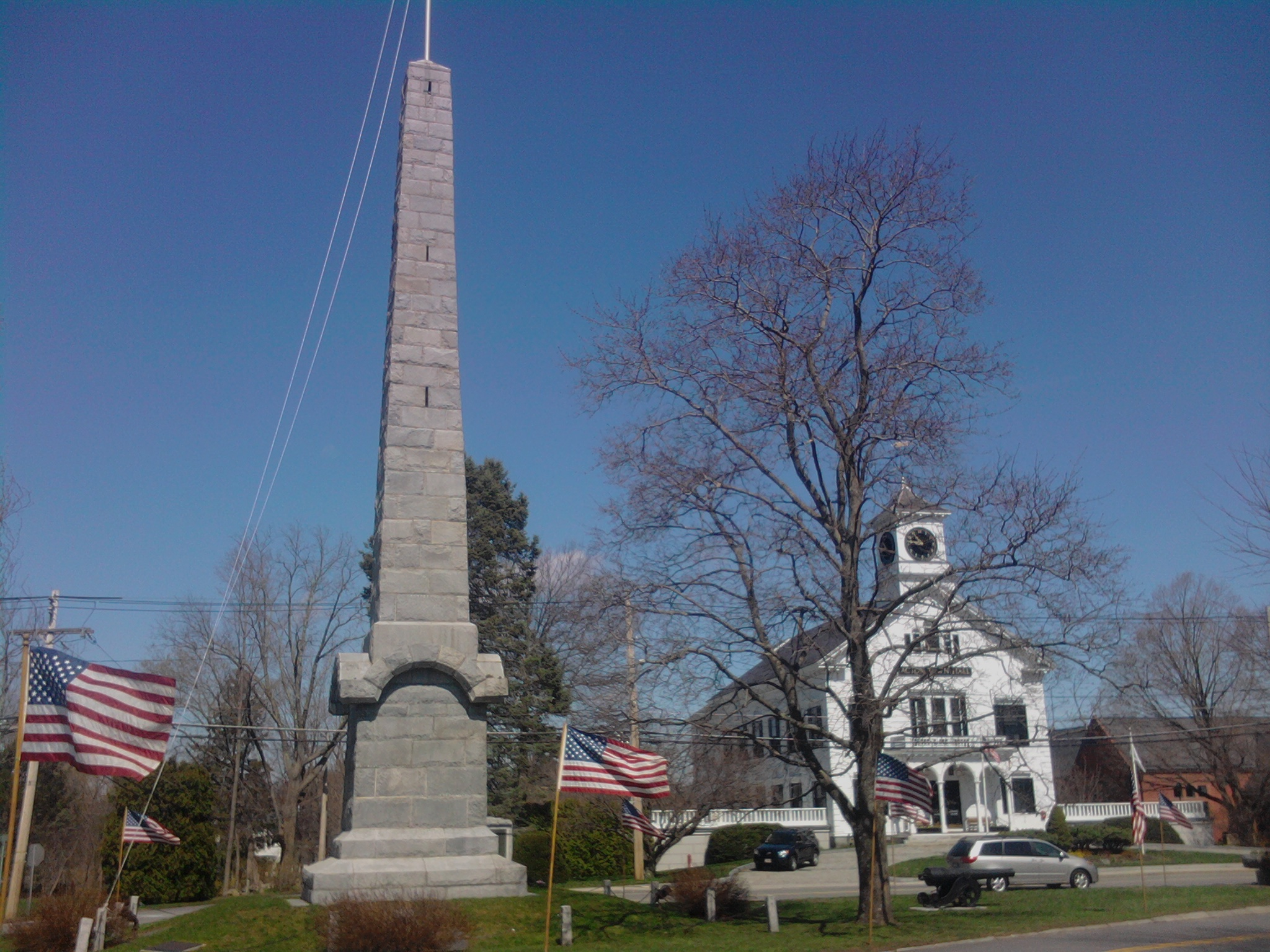
Isaac Davis Monument and the Acton Town Hall

Concord was the first inland colonial town established in the Massachusetts Bay Colony. The original boundaries of Concord included all of Acton and residents used the Acton land as grazing fields for their animals. In 1639, the first homestead was built within the modern day boundaries of the town.

Acton was established as an independent town on July 3, 1735. Acton has held annual town meetings since 1735, the records of which are held at Acton's Memorial Library.

Acton residents participated in the growing hostility with Great Britain by sending a list of grievances to King George III on October 3, 1774. The anniversary of this day is celebrated in Acton as Crown Resistance Day.

On April 19, 1775, during the Revolutionary War's start, a company of minutemen from Acton responded to the call to arms initiated by Paul Revere (who rode with other riders, William Dawes and Samuel Prescott, with Prescott the only one of the three who was able reach Acton itself) and fought at the North Bridge in Concord as part of the Battle of Lexington and Concord. The Acton minutemen were led by Captain Isaac Davis. When a company was needed to lead the advance on the bridge which was defended by the British regulars, Captain Davis was heard to reply, "I haven't a man who is afraid to go." It has been said that the Acton men led because they alone were equipped with bayonets.

The colonists advanced on the bridge; in the exchange of musket fire that followed, Captain Isaac Davis and Private Abner Hosmer of Acton were killed. Davis was the first officer to die in the American Revolutionary War. In local terms, the events of the day were characterized as "the battle of Lexington, fought in Concord, by men of Acton".

=== Industrialization and Civil War ===
During the 19th century, Acton participated in the growing Industrial Revolution. By the mid-19th century, Acton was an industrial center for the production of barrels (cooperage). There were also a powder mill, three gristmills and four sawmills in town. The American Powder Mills complex extended downstream along the Assabet River and manufactured gunpowder from 1835 to 1940.

On October 1, 1844, the railroad came to Acton. The Fitchburg Railroad was routed through South and West Acton so that it could serve the mills. South Acton became a busy rail center and was the division point for the Marlborough Branch Railroad. With the railroad came increasing development in those areas. In addition to the Fitchburg Railroad, two others crossed the town: the Nashua and Acton, and the Framingham and Lowell. These two railroads shared a double track right-of-way that ran from West Concord (aka Concord Junction) through East Acton and then splitting in North Acton in the vicinity of Route 27 and Ledge Rock Way.

In 1874, the population of the town was almost 1700. The town established its first newspaper, The Acton Patriot, and the residents of West Acton formed the first library, The Citizen's Library. In 1890, the Memorial Library was completed and given to the town by William Allan Wilde as a memorial to the Acton soldiers who fought in the Civil War.

== Government ==
Acton uses the Open Town Meeting form of town government. The town charter specifies that the annual town meeting must begin on the first Monday in May. The Select Board may also call a special town meeting at other times of the year to consider other business. Citizens may call for a special town meeting by submitting a petition signed by 200 registered voters to the town clerk. Anyone may attend Town Meeting but only registered voters may vote. Acton also has a water district, which is run separately from town government, as a public utility. On May 6, 2024, Acton held an Annual Town Meeting with a record number of 2,601 voters within four different rooms inside the Acton-Boxborough Regional High School.

Acton's elected officials include the following: the Select Board (five members, three-year terms), the Town Moderator (one person, one-year term), Acton members of the Acton-Boxborough Regional School Committee (seven members, three-year terms), the Housing Authority (four members, five-year terms) and Memorial Library Trustees (three members, three-year terms). In addition, the town moderator appoints a finance committee (nine members, three-year terms) which issues an opinion on each of the warrant articles presented to Town Meeting. In addition, a separate and independent branch of government, the Acton Water District, was established in 1912 and consists of three elected commissioners, an elected moderator, an elected clerk, an appointed district counsel, finance committee, Water Land Management Advisory Committee, and paid professional staff.

The town services are primarily funded through the residential property tax, which is subject to the limitations imposed by state statute known as Proposition 2½. The Water District is funded through water rates, connection fees and property rental. The Water District revenues, however, are not subject to Proposition 2 1/2.

=== State and federal government ===
On the state level, Acton is represented in the Massachusetts Senate by James "Jamie" Eldridge, and in the Massachusetts House of Representatives by Danillo Sena and Simon Cataldo. On the federal level, Acton is part of Massachusetts's 3rd congressional district, represented by Lori Trahan. The state's senior (Class I) member of the United States Senate is Elizabeth Warren. The junior (Class II) senator is Ed Markey.

=== Civic infrastructure ===
The civic infrastructure grew to accommodate the increasing population. A Water District was established in 1912 and a town-wide Fire Department was established in 1913. Acton was the first town in the area to have water-bound macadam highways.

In 2005 a new Public Safety Facility was built that expanded space for the Police Department and provided for a Joint Dispatch area with the Fire Department. The newest fire station was constructed in North Acton on Harris Street and placed into service in 2022.

==== Water district ====
The Acton Water District is a community public water supply that delivers drinking water to the majority (about 90 percent) of the residents of the town of Acton. All of the water provided from the district comes from seven wells located within the township. The district's system consists of 106 miles (171 km) of water main, four storage tanks, and water treatment facilities including aeration, activated granulated carbon (GAC), an advanced Zenon(R) filtration facility, plus fluoridation and state mandated chlorination.

Separate from the Water District, residents of Great Road (Route 2A) obtain their water from the mains running down their street, that connect Nagog Pond to the Concord water system. They are billed by Concord. The pond is both in North Acton and Littleton, but Concord apparently has the water rights.

== Town recreation areas ==
=== Conservation lands ===
Acton has a total of over 1,650 acres (7 km^{2}) of town-owned conservation lands.

- Acton Arboretum: A park in the center of Acton which consists of 53 acres (210,000 m^{2}) of woods, meadows, swamp, ponds, old apple orchards, a glacial esker, and a bog. The land was purchased by the town in 1976 and was designated an Arboretum in 1986. It now includes a 19th-century herb garden, a hosta garden, a wildflower garden, a butterfly garden and a rhododendron garden. A fragrance garden is being constructed.
- Pratt's Brook: A 57-acre (230,000 m^{2}) property located in South Acton.
- Great Hill. A 185-acre (0.7 km^{2}) property located in South Acton behind the School Street fire station, which includes picnic tables. In addition there is a skating pond and two sets of playing fields.
- Grassy Pond and Nagog Hill. Two adjoining conservation areas located in North Acton which total 250 acres (1.0 km^{2}) of land.
- Wills Hole Conservation Area and Town Forest. A 73-acre (300,000 m^{2}) property located in North Acton off of Quarry Road, adjacent to the North Acton Recreation Area (NARA Park), includes a Bog and abuts an inactive granite quarry (private property).
- Nashoba Brook, Spring Hill, Camp Acton, Canterbury Hill. Four adjoining conservation areas in North Acton that total over 600 acres (2.4 km^{2}). The trails in this area are Acton's portion of the Bay Circuit Trail and Greenway which is a hiking path that encircles Boston—starting in Ipswich and ending in Duxbury. A historical trail, named the Trail Through Time, also overlays the trail system and provides interpretive plaques at various locations on the loop that include Wheeler Lane, the Potato Cave, The Pencil Factory, and other sites. The trails through the Canterbury Hill section connect to the town of Carlisle conservation trail network.
- Bulette Land/Town Forest consists of 48 acres (190,000 m^{2}), mainly of wetlands and forest.
- Heath Hen Meadow consists of 99 acres (400,000 m^{2}) of land.
- Jenks Land consists of 30 acres (120,000 m^{2}) of land. It is home to over 170 species of birds that one man had recorded one year.
- Morrison Farm & Ice House Pond: Located off of Concord Rd, these 70 acres (280,000 m^{2}) includes a house, a stable and corral, and various open fields and water.

These town conservation areas, and some smaller ones, are described and mapped in a website maintained by the town's volunteer Land Stewardship Committee.

=== Playing fields & playgrounds ===
- Leary Field: Located on the central school campus between the junior high and high school, it contains an all purpose turf field and running track. It is home to Acton-Boxborough Regional High School athletics.
- High School Complex Contains one grass playing field, two contiguous lighted multi-sport turf fields, five tennis courts, a softball diamond and two baseball diamonds (one lighted).
- Elm Street Complex: Contains two tennis courts, a small sided playing field, and a lighted softball diamonds, primarily used by the Adult & Youth Softball Leagues. It is adjacent to the Douglas School yard which contains a baseball diamond and two basketball courts.
- Gates Fields Contains two softball diamond located at the Gates School and a large grass area used for ABRSD Field Hockey teams.
- Nathaniel Allen Recreation Area (NARA): Originally named the North Acton Recreation Area, NARA's name was changed in 2012 to honor Nathaniel M. Allen, an Acton resident who was awarded the Medal of Honor for his actions in the Civil War. It contains a softball diamond, a large configurable field used for multiple sports, a swimming pond, playground, a performance stage with amphitheater, and a handicap accessible softball diamond with a synthetic surface- The Joseph Lalli Miracle Field. NARA is also used for the town's Fourth of July Fireworks Celebration.
- Veterans Field: Contains two baseball diamonds and a playground.
- MacPherson & Hart Fields: A baseball diamonds located at Conant School.
- TJ O'Grady Skate Park: Located at 66 Hayward Road offers various surfaces for skateboarding and rollerblading.
- Jones Field: It contains a single baseball diamond and a playground.
- Great Hill: Contains a large configurable field, a smaller single soccer field, and a playground. This is located in the front portion of the conservation area.
- School Street Fields: Located off School Street near Route 2 is a large grass surface configurable to several multi-dimension playing fields.
- Concord Road: Located next to Morrison Farm on Woodlawn Cemetery land is used primarily for soccer.
- Gardner Field: Located on 111 in West Acton, the area consists of a playground, basketball hoop, and field area.
- Goward Playground: Located behind the Acton Memorial Library

=== Bike paths ===
- Bruce Freeman Rail Trail. The Acton section of the BFRT officially opened April 3, 2018, and runs north through the communities of Carlisle, Westford, Chelmsford and Lowell. It has been extended south into Concord; when complete, the BFRT will run 25 miles along the former rail bed of the Framingham and Lowell Railroad, continuing south through Sudbury and Framingham.
- Assabet River Rail Trail. Running along the rail bed of Boston & Maine Railroad's former Marlborough Branch, the Acton portion of the trail starts at MBTA's South Acton Train Station and runs 3.4 miles south through Maynard to the Maynard:Stow border, where it then continues another 1.8 miles as a dirt road on private property with allowed public access.

== Education ==
Acton is part of Minuteman Technical High School District along with Arlington, Bolton, Concord, Dover, Lancaster, Lexington, Needham, and Stow.

Acton is part of the Acton Boxborough Regional School District (ABRSD) along with Boxborough. The town has five elementary schools serving K–6: CT Douglas, Gates, Luther Conant, McCarthy-Towne and Merriam. The town has one public junior high school serving 7–8, the R.J. Grey Junior High School. High school students then attend Acton-Boxborough Regional High School from grades 9–12.

ABRSD has an uncommon method of assigning students to elementary schools, called "Open Enrollment". First-time incoming kindergarten parents participate in a lottery-based selection process where the parents "choose" the school by listing their preferences in ranked order. Boxborough students have priority for attendance in the school in their own town, but participate in the lottery if they wish to attend an Acton school. Any remaining spaces at Blanchard become available in the lottery.

This method of school choice has a large impact on the nature of the town. Acton is less oriented around neighborhoods than towns which have neighborhood based schools. This carries over into the recreational youth sport organizations whose teams are not organized around specific elementary schools. As a result, students and families are likely to have broad social connections in all parts of the town rather than being limited to neighborhoods. School Choice also benefits the towns real estate market since home valuations are not impacted by the perceived desirability of given neighborhood's school.

While the curriculum in the district is fairly standardized, each of the elementary schools has a different teaching philosophy. The schools and their philosophy of education are:

- Conant School. Named for Luther Conant who taught for 17 years in the school district, served on the School Committee, and was Town Moderator for 40 years.
- Douglas School. Named for Carolyn T. Douglas who was a teacher and principal in the Acton schools from 1940 to 1967.
- Gates School. Named for Paul P. Gates who was the school physician from 1948 to 1968.
- McCarthy-Towne School. Named for Julia McCarthy who taught at the South Acton School from 1906 to 1952 and Marion Towne who was a teacher in the primary and secondary schools in Acton from 1921 to 1959. McCarthy-Towne School is housed in the Parker Damon Building (named for McCarthy-Towne's first principal, J. Parker Damon), which it shares with the Merriam School. At McCarthy-Towne, students generally call their teachers by their first names, a practice shared by Merriam.
- Merriam School. Named for Florence A. Merriam who taught for 35 years in Acton. Merriam offers a project-based curriculum. At Merriam, teachers teach the same group of students for two years (i.e., a teacher will teach first grade one year, second grade the next and then wrap back to first). This practice is called "looping". Merriam School is housed in the Parker Damon Building which it shares with the McCarthy-Towne school. At Merriam as well as at McCarthy-Towne, students call their teachers by their first names.

=== Acton-Boxborough Junior High and High School ===
The Acton-Boxborough Regional School has a single Junior High School (Raymond J. Grey Junior High School) for grades 7 & 8 and a single High School (Acton-Boxborough Regional High School) for grades 9 through 12. Both the junior high and high school were enlarged and renovated in 2000–2005. Both buildings are located at the school district campus in Acton.

Current enrollment at the junior high is approximately 1,000 students, while the high school has roughly 2,000 students. The high school consistently ranks highly among rankings of the best public high schools in the Greater Boston area (defined as within I-495); Most recently, the school was placed 1st in by Boston Magazine in 2020 and 2021.

== Cultural institutions ==
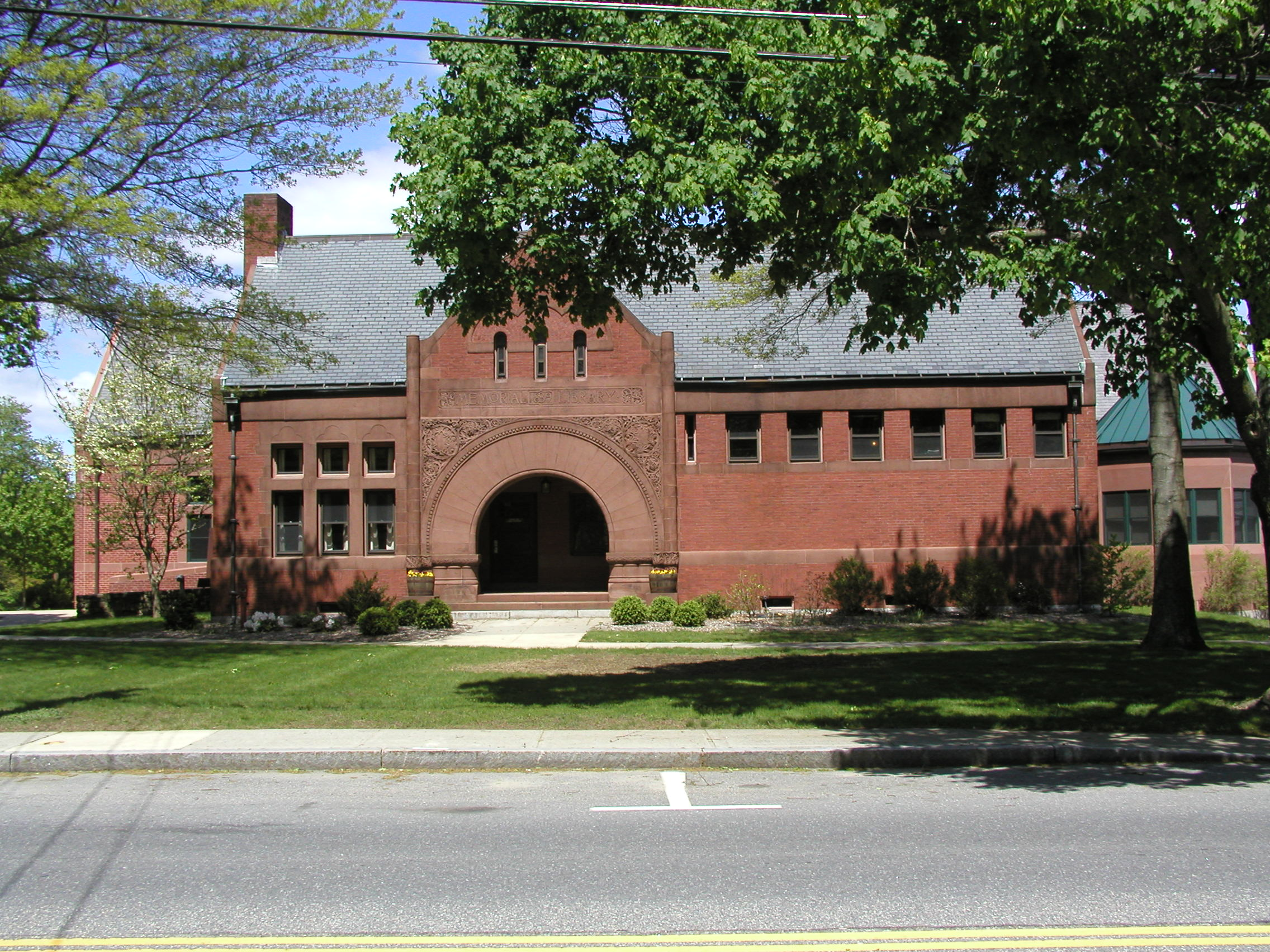
Acton Memorial Library

=== Libraries ===
Acton has two public libraries: the Acton Memorial Library and the West Acton Citizens' Library. The Acton Memorial Library was given to the town of Acton by William Allan Wilde as a memorial to its Civil War veterans in 1890. The building was expanded in 1967, and a second major expansion was completed in 1999. There are also libraries in each of the elementary schools, the junior high, and the high school. The Acton Historical Society owns the Jenks Library which contains historical maps, documents, photographs and drawings.

=== Museums ===
- Discovery Museum is a hands-on museum for families.
- Iron Work Farm: Settlement of South Acton; 'Iron Work Farm in Acton, Inc.' is a non-profit, historical corporation chartered in Massachusetts since 1964, that operates two historic houses: Jones Tavern and Faulkner House. Each house is open to the public on the last Sunday of the month from May to October. The facilities are also open as part of the local Patriots' Day holiday observance each April.
- Hosmer House: This Revolutionary War-era home, which is owned and maintained by the Acton Historical Society, is typically open to the public on Patriots' Day, September 27 ('Crown Resistance Day'), as well as May 27 and June 24, from 2 to 4 o'clock.

=== Theater ===
Though there are several theater groups in Acton, the two eldest are Theatre III and Open Door Theater. Theatre III was founded in 1956 when three organizations (a local chorus, dance group, and dramatic troupe) combined to present a show. It produces several plays and musicals each season in the historical old church building on Central Street.

Open Door Theater is a community theater group which was founded to provide an inclusive theater experience. Open Door produces one large musical each year which features a large number of performers ranging in age from nine to adult, including people with special needs. They perform and rehearse in the Dragonfly Theatre, located inside the R. J. Grey Junior High School.

=== Traditions ===
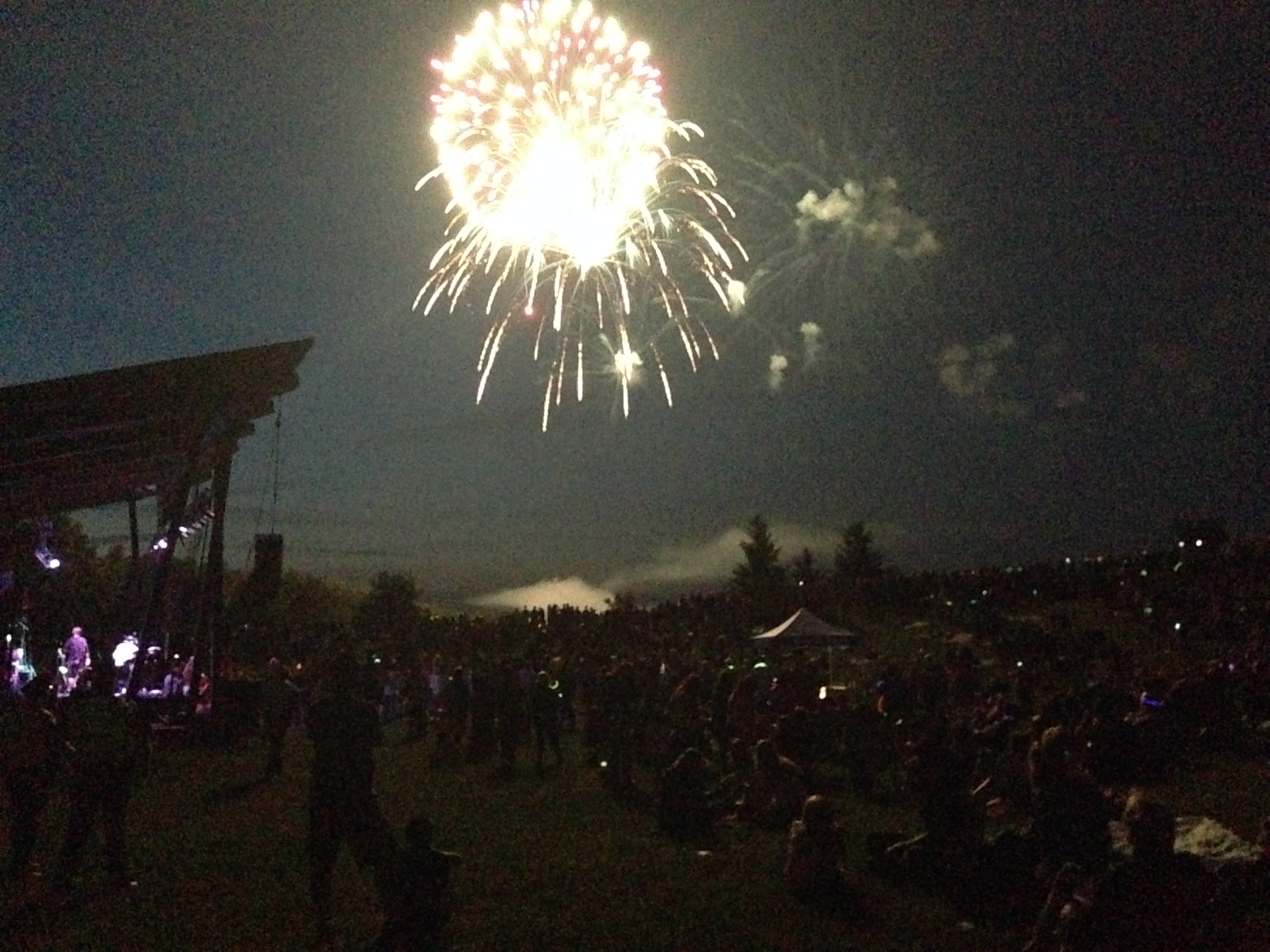
July 4, 2015 fireworks in Acton

- Each year on Patriots' Day (traditionally April 19; since 1969, observed on the third Monday in April as part of a three-day Patriots' Day weekend), the Acton Minutemen lead a march from Acton Center to the Old North Bridge in Concord. This route is known as 'The Isaac Davis Trail' and is listed on the National Register of Historic Places. Since 1957, Acton's Troop 1 of the Boy Scouts of America have organized an annual march along the Isaac Davis line of march, and since 1976 the "Scouters of the Isaac Davis Trail" have organized the annual Isaac Davis Camporee.

== Points of interest ==
- Jones Tavern. The main part of the tavern, originally home to the Jones family of South Acton, was built in 1732 as a house for Samuel Jones Jr. By 1750 it had become a tavern and general store. It is speculated to be the first store in Acton and holds the distinction of being the town's longest established business, merging into James Tuttle's store in 1845 and operating under various names until 1950.
- The Faulkner House and Mills. The house was built for Ephraim Jones (1679–1710), founder in 1702 of an early textile business and other mills that formed the nucleus of the present town of Acton. Ammi Ruhamah Faulkner rented the mills in 1738 and then purchased them in 1742. Six generations of Faulkners lived in the house over a 202-year period. The largest and most central house of this settlement, it served as the local garrison house for protection from Indian raids made along the Massachusetts frontier during Queen Anne's War of 1702–1713. The Faulkner homestead served as a garrison for South Acton Militia during the Revolutionary War.
- Town Center: The civic center of town is marked by the Acton Monument which is the final resting place of Captain Isaac Davis, James Hayward and Abner Hosmer. The stone on which Captain Davis mortally fell is situated between the west side of the monument and Main Street. The main entrance to the Town Hall, around the rear of the building, contains Isaac Davis's plow which was used by Daniel Chester French for the statue he cast for North Bridge.

== Transportation ==
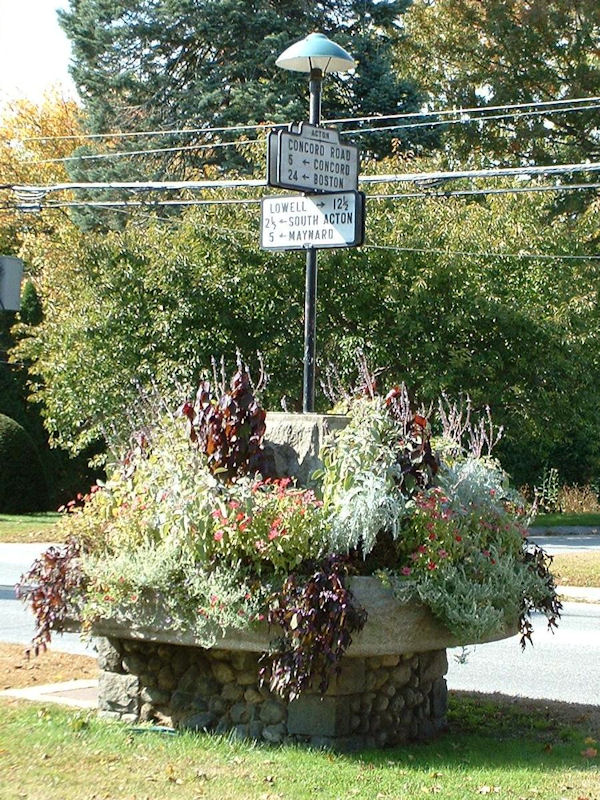
Antique road sign in a well near Acton Center, along Route 27

Acton is five miles (8.0 km) from I-495 and ten miles (16 km) from I-95/Route 128. Routes 2, 2A, 27, 62, 111, and 119 run through town.

The MBTA Commuter Rail Fitchburg Line train stops at the South Acton station. Railroad service provided to Fitchburg, Leominster, Shirley, Ayer, Littleton, Concord, Lincoln, Weston, Waltham, Belmont, Cambridge, and Boston.

Yankee Lines provides a commuter bus service to Copley Square in Boston from the "77 Great Road Mall" in Acton on MA-2A and MA-119.

The Bruce Freeman Rail Trail provides a paved bicycle commuter option north to Westford, Chelmsford and Lowell. The Assabet River Rail Trail provides a connection south to Maynard. The trails do not have lighting and are not snowplowed.

== In media ==
- Acton is the setting of the poem "The Vanishing Red," by New England poet Robert Frost (Mountain Interval, 1920), but there is no information to confirm this refers to Acton, Massachusetts, or Acton, Maine, or a fictional Acton. Frost never lived in or near Acton, Massachusetts.
- Acton is a setting in "The Cure" an episode of the TV series Fringe, however the actual filming was not done in Acton.
- Acton is a film location in the Hollywood adaption of "Labor Day" by Joyce Maynard
- Acton features prominently in the TNT series Falling Skies about an alien invasion. The main character is a former Boston University professor who is now second-in-command of the Second Massachusetts, a group of fighter and civilians fleeing an overrun Boston. The group heads to Acton to set up a new base of operations and raid the Acton Armory.
- Acton is the setting of the novel One True Loves by Taylor Jenkins Reid which was later turned into a film.

== Radio stations ==
- WAEM-LP (94.9 MHz, 21 watts): a town-operated low power community radio station (LPFM) that airs a music variety format
- WHAB (89.1 MHz, 8 watts): a high school radio station operated by the Acton-Boxborough Regional High School that airs a student radio format

== Notable people ==
- Bob Adams, electrical engineer, Institute of Electrical and Electronics Engineers Fellow
- Tom Barrasso, NHL hockey player
- Bob Brooke, NHL hockey player
- James Brown, co-founder of Little, Brown and Company publisher
- Steve Carell, comedic actor
- Howie Carr, talk-radio personality
- Robert Creeley, poet
- Isaac Davis, captain of the Acton Minutemen, first officer to die in the American Revolution
- Dan Duquette, general manager of the Boston Red Sox and Baltimore Orioles
- Henry Durant, Congregational clergyman, first president of College of California, two-term mayor of Oakland, California
- Christian Finnegan, comedian
- Alice Haskins, government botanist and professor
- Drew Houston, founder of Dropbox
- Shin Lim, close-up magician and winner of Americas' Got Talent
- Jesse Lauriston Livermore, early 20th century stock trader
- Selina Maitreya, international photography consultant and author
- Thomas B. Marsh, early leader in the Church of Jesus Christ of Latter-day Saints
- Julie Mason, newspaper and radio journalist
- Ian Moran, NHL hockey player
- Bill Morrissey, Folk music singer/songwriter
- Dr. John "Dropkick" Murphy, wrestler, operator of Bellows Farm Sanatorium in Acton, and namesake of the Boston-based band Dropkick Murphys
- Jeff Norton, NHL hockey player
- Ted Nivison, YouTuber
- Taylor Jenkins Reid, author of popular novels such as Seven Husbands of Evelyn Hugo and Daisy Jones & the Six
- Mallory Souliotis, NWHL hockey player
- Caroll Spinney, puppeteer who created the Sesame Street characters Big Bird and Oscar the Grouch
- Evelyn Stevens, professional road cyclist
- Madeline Amy Sweeney, American Airlines Flight 11 flight attendant killed during the September 11 attacks
- Frederick Heyliger, officer with Easy Company, 2nd Battalion, 506th Parachute Infantry Regiment, in the 101st Airborne Division of the United States Army during World War II.
- Matt Shearer, viral social media journalist for WBZ
- William Allan Wilde, state representative and founder of the Acton Memorial Library
