= Henry E. Warren =

American inventor

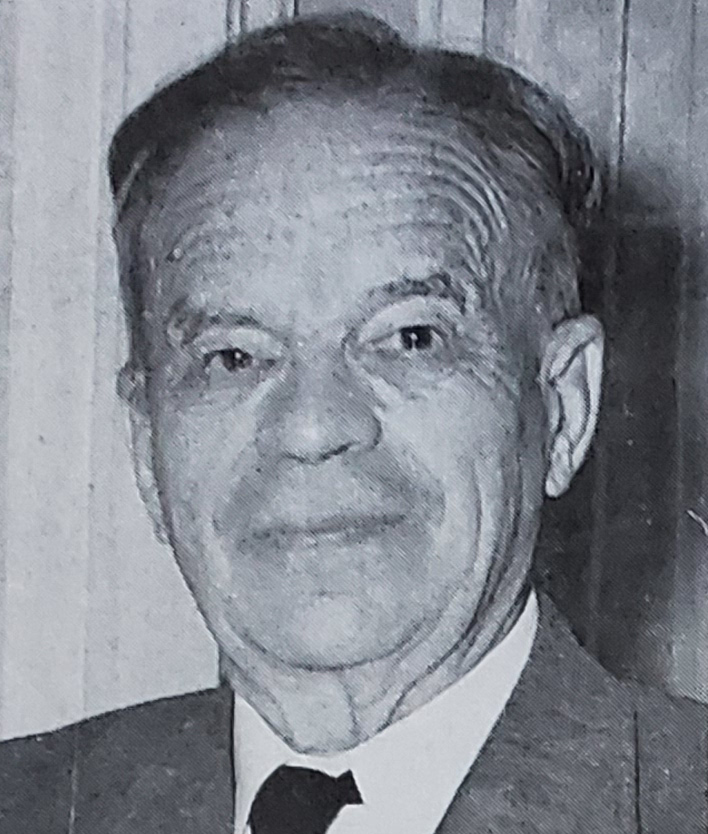
- Warren, 1952
- Born: May 21, 1872; Boston, Massachusetts, U.S.
- Died: September 21, 1957 (aged 85); Ashland, Massachusetts, U.S.
- Education: Allen School
- Alma mater: Massachusetts Institute of Technology
- Occupations: Inventor, business owner
- Known for: "Father of electric time"
- Spouse: Edith B. Smith (m. 1907)
- Awards: Lamme Medal (1934); Wetherill Medal (1935)

Henry Ellis Warren (May 21, 1872 – September 21, 1957) was an American inventor, best known as the inventor of the first synchronous electric clock. He has been called the "father of electric time".

== Biography ==
Warren was born in Boston in 1872 and attended the Allen School. He graduated from the Massachusetts Institute of Technology in 1894 with a Bachelor of Science degree in electrical engineering. He settled in Ashland, Massachusetts, in 1907.

Warren's early career started as an engineer for Nathaniel Lombard, designing water-driven machinery for the N. Lombard Improved Governor Company (Note: Governor in this context refers to a device used to measure and regulate the speed of a machine, such as an engine.) headquartered in Roxbury, Boston. The company was moved to Ashland in 1904 and Warren went with it. Warren worked his way up to plant superintendent, eventually purchasing the company in 1937, at which time it was renamed Lombard Governor Company. Warren was owner and president of the company until his death in 1957.

Warren married Edith B. Smith in 1907. The two resided in a farmhouse on Chestnut Street in Ashland, behind which was the barn where he later invented the synchronous electric clock. Warren owned about a dozen milking cows and operated a small dairy as well as growing an orchard of apple and peach trees. The couple never had children.

In 1912, Warren founded the Warren Clock Company as he began to tinker with gears and rotors in his barn. In 1918, Warren patented the first synchronous electric clock, which kept time from the oscillations of the power grid; he also patented 134 other inventions. He changed the name to the Warren Telechron Company soon after and served as president of the company from 1914 to 1943. Between 1916 and 1926, the company sold 20 million clocks. In 1940, Warren invented the "singing clock", which instead of a pendulum had a vibrating metal string. General Electric acquired a half interest in Telechron in 1929, and full interest in 1943 after Warren’s retirement as president. Telechron's clocks remained popular into the 1960s, being seen in schools, hospitals, and train stations across the country. With the advent of the battery-operated quartz clock, electric clock sales begs to fall. The Ashland plant was sold to Timex in 1979. By 1992, Timex had decided to move clock production overseas, closing the Ashland plant. A memorial was dedicated to Warren in that year to commemorate his significant service to the town and its people.

Warren was also a key figure in establishing many organizations within Ashland, including its Boy Scout and Girl Scout troops, as well as the Ashland Town Forest. He also served on the town’s Board of Selectmen. Land donated by Warren's widow in Ashland became the Warren Conference Center—located next to Ashland State Park, it is used by companies and colleges for meetings and training. The Town of Ashland named one of its elementary schools after Warren and declared May 21st to be Henry E. Warren Day following his passing.

== Examples of Telechron clocks ==
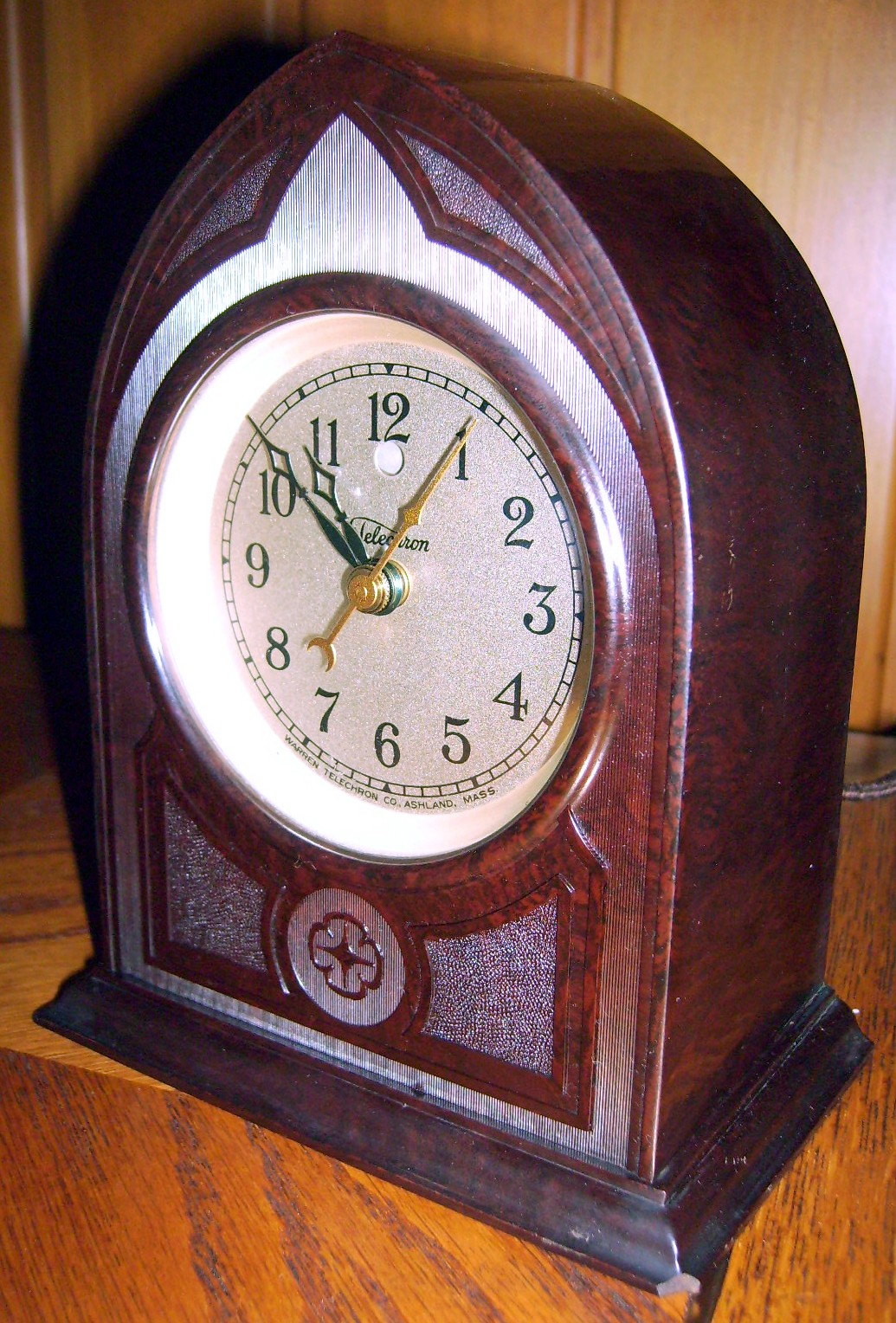
Telechron 355 "Cathedral" (1927–32)

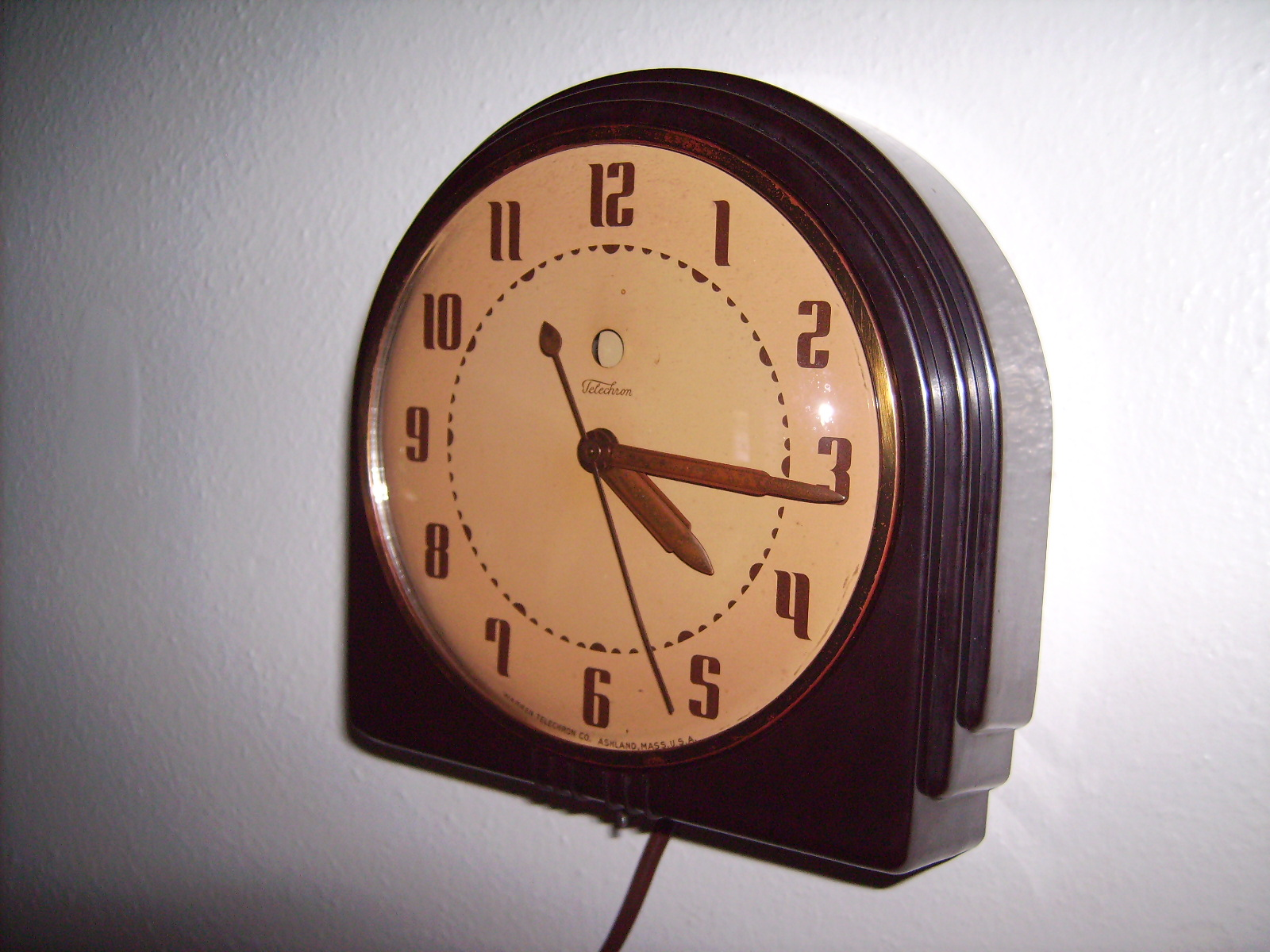
Telechron 2H07-Br "Administrator" (1937–40)

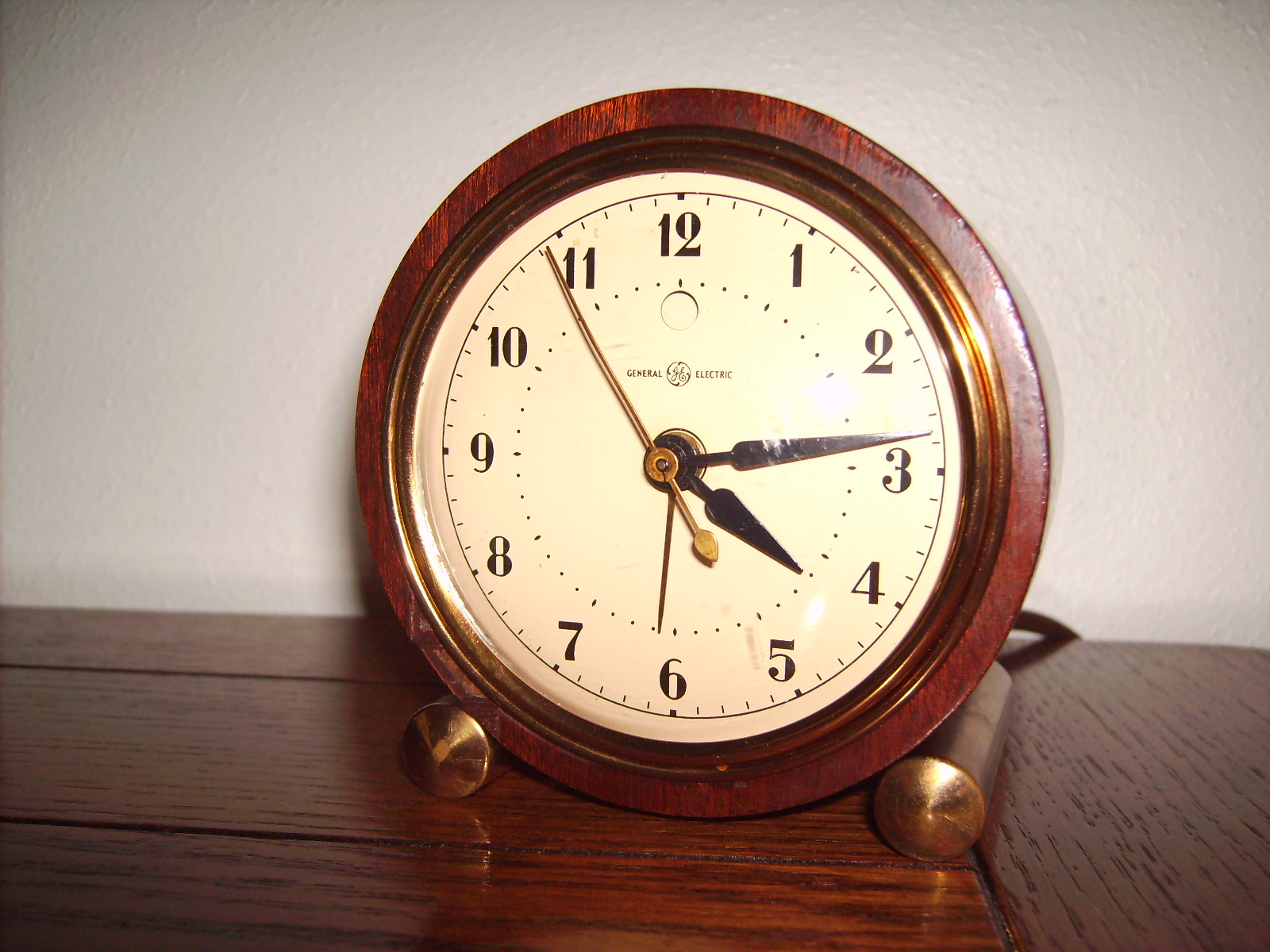
Telechron 7F72 "Heralder" (1930s)

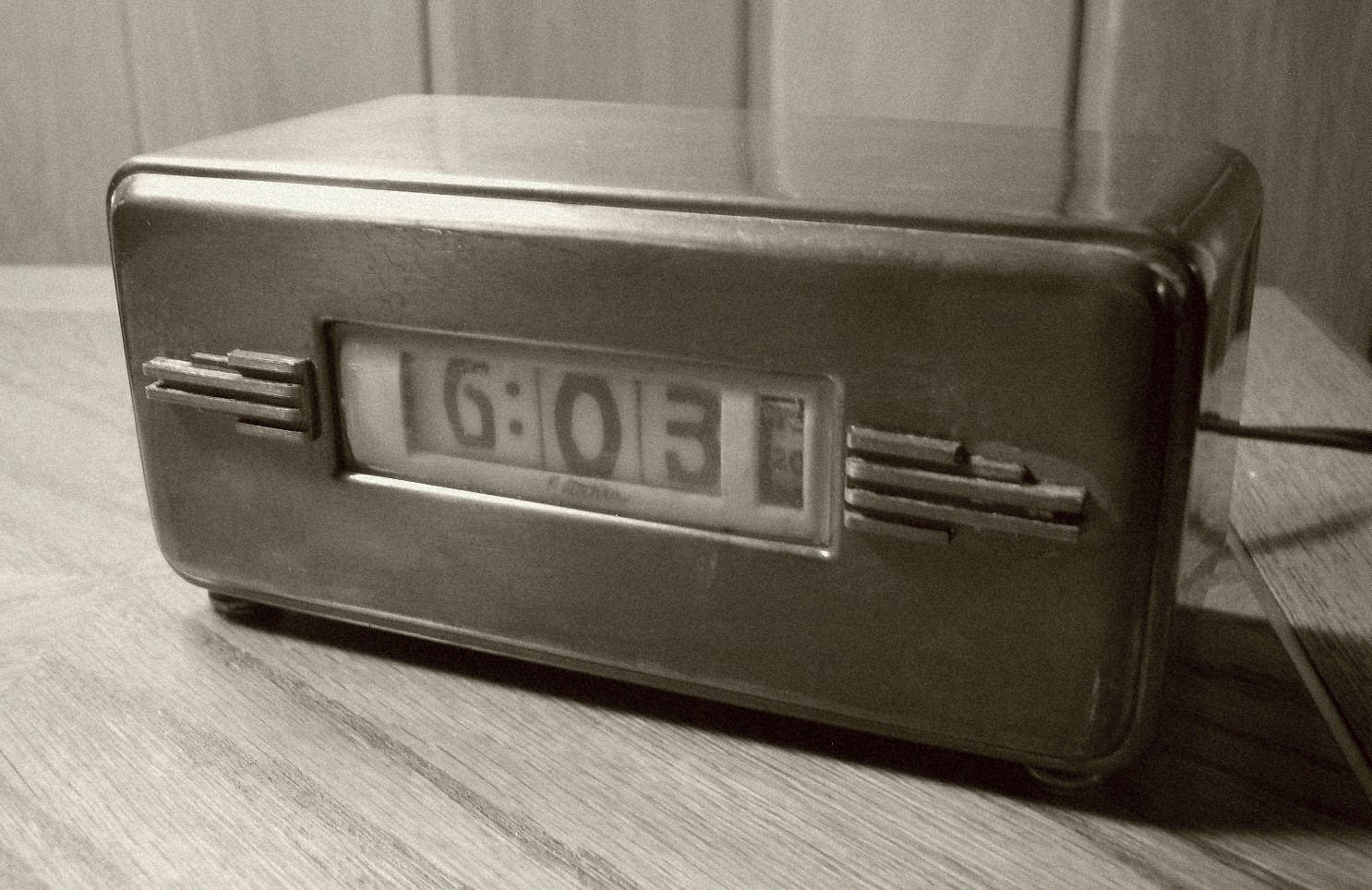
Telechron 8B23 "Register" (1946–48)

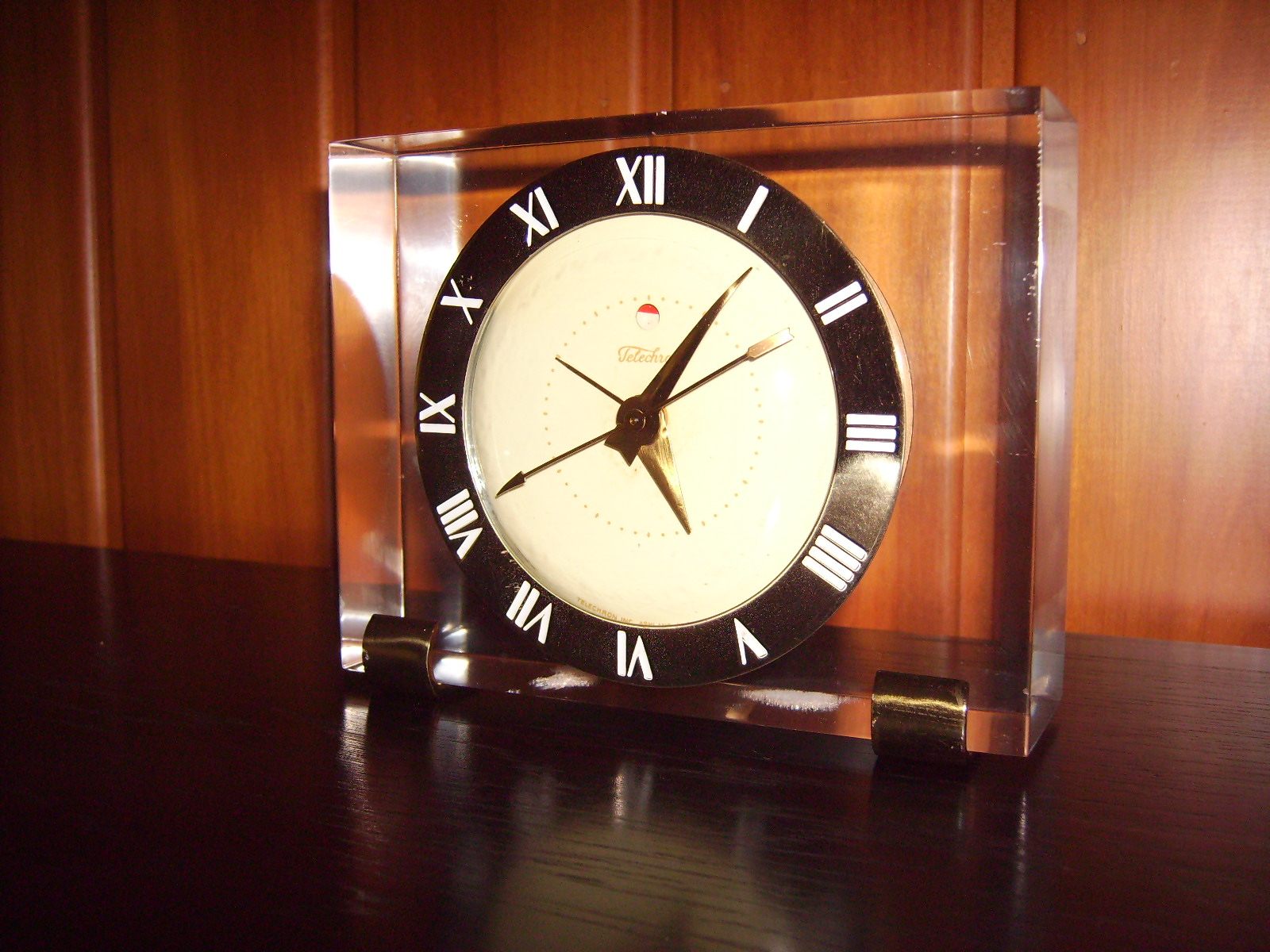
Telechron 7H141 "Airlux" (1946–57)

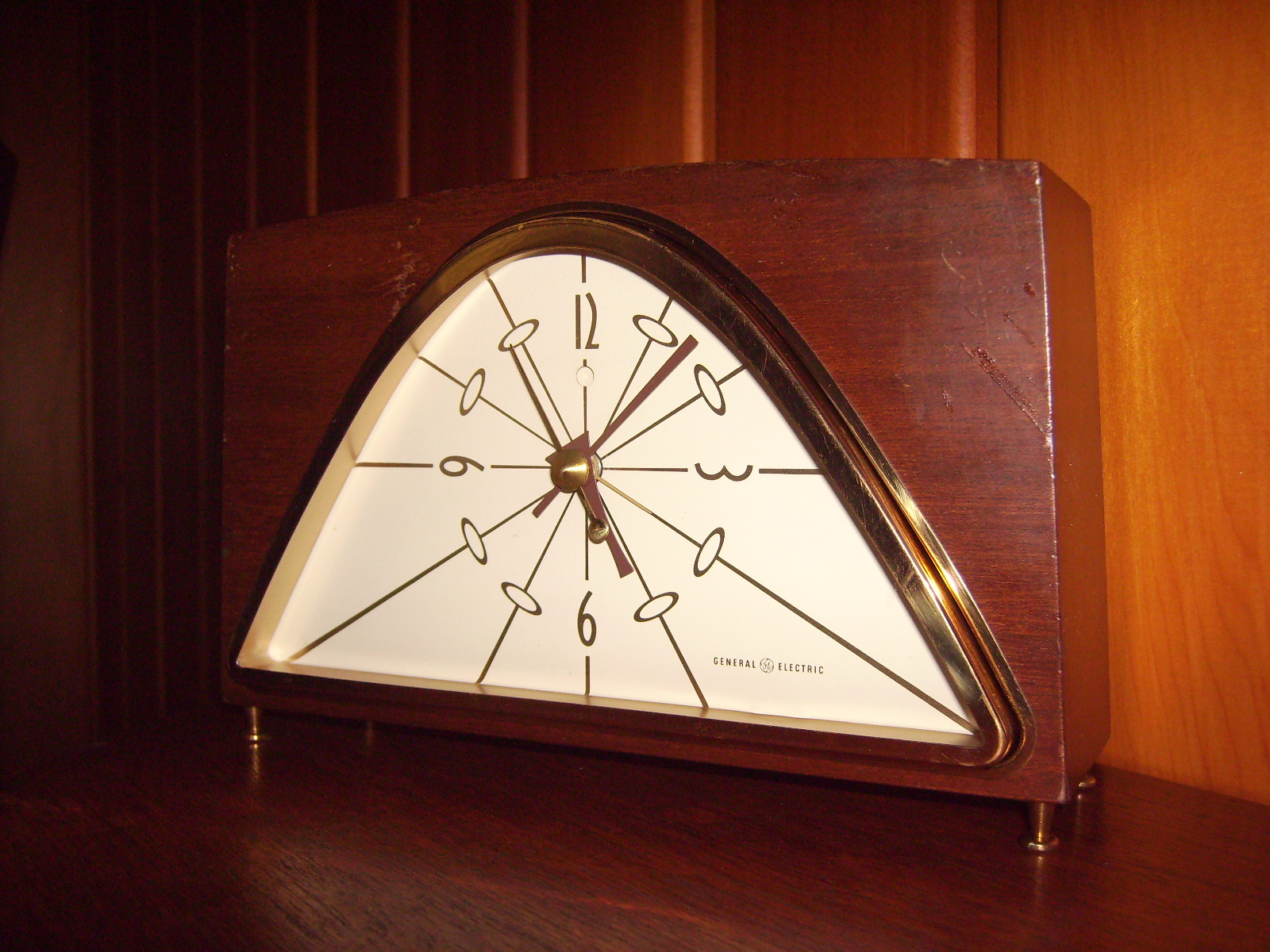
Telechron 7H257 "Dimension" (1954–59)
