= Stone Park (Ashland, Massachusetts) =

Public park in Ashland, Massachusetts

Coordinates: 42°15′27″N 71°28′01″W

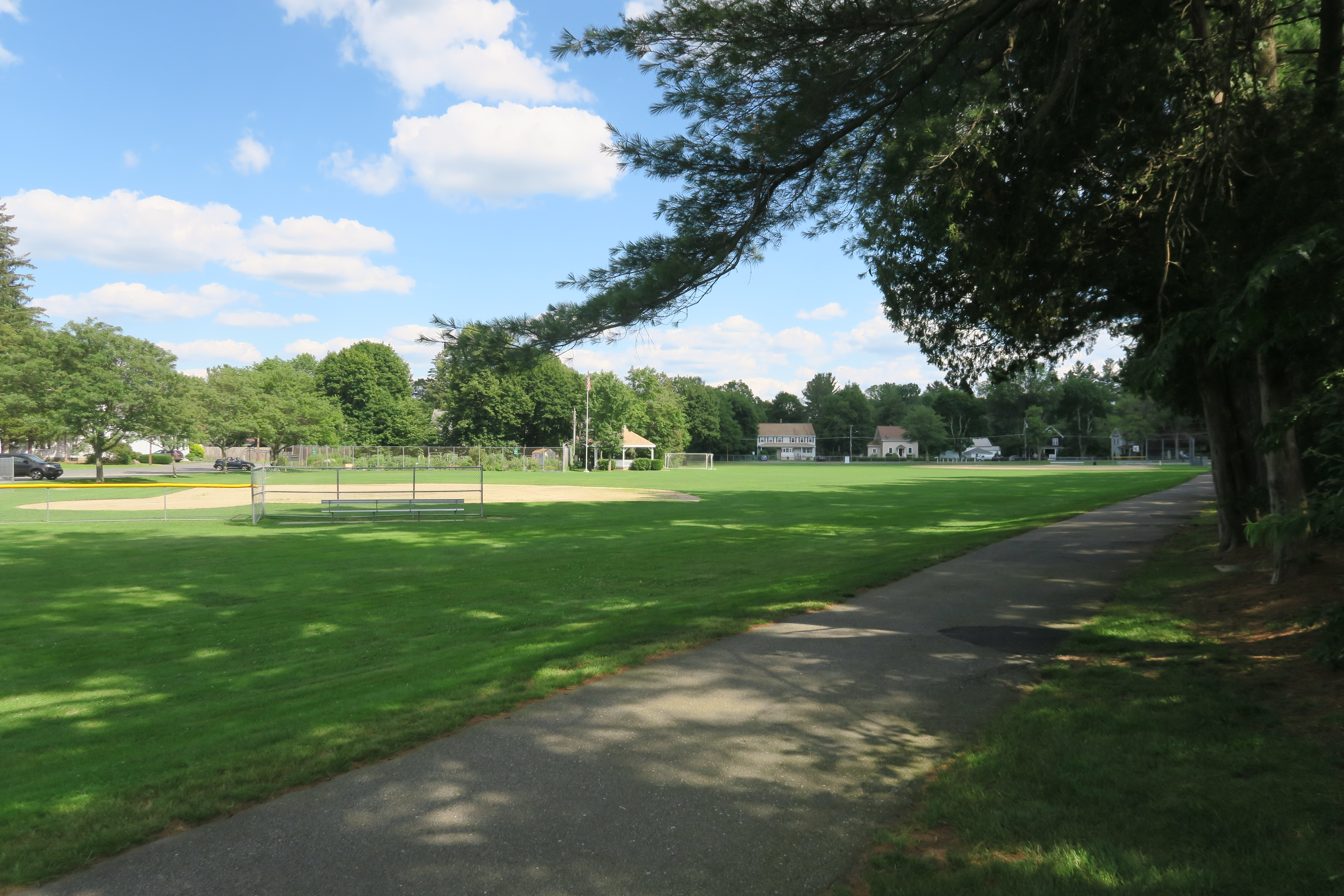
Stone Park

Stone Park is a public park located in the center of Ashland, Massachusetts.

The park contains a play ground called the "Kidspot," a basketball court, a soccer field, and two little league fields. The park hosts local soccer, baseball, and softball leagues and is the site of a community garden started in 2009. In the summer there are free concerts held every Sunday at the gazebo and once a year Ashland Day is held there.

Over the years the Ashland Day Committee has raised money for improvements in the park including the gazebo and a community building. The park has public bathrooms and a Snack Shack that the committee's volunteers help to maintain.

In 2022, Grace Soonjoo Moon founded the Stone Park Music Festival "with the intention of sharing the joy and benefits of classical music to the community."
