= Ashland Town House =

- U.S. National Register of Historic Places
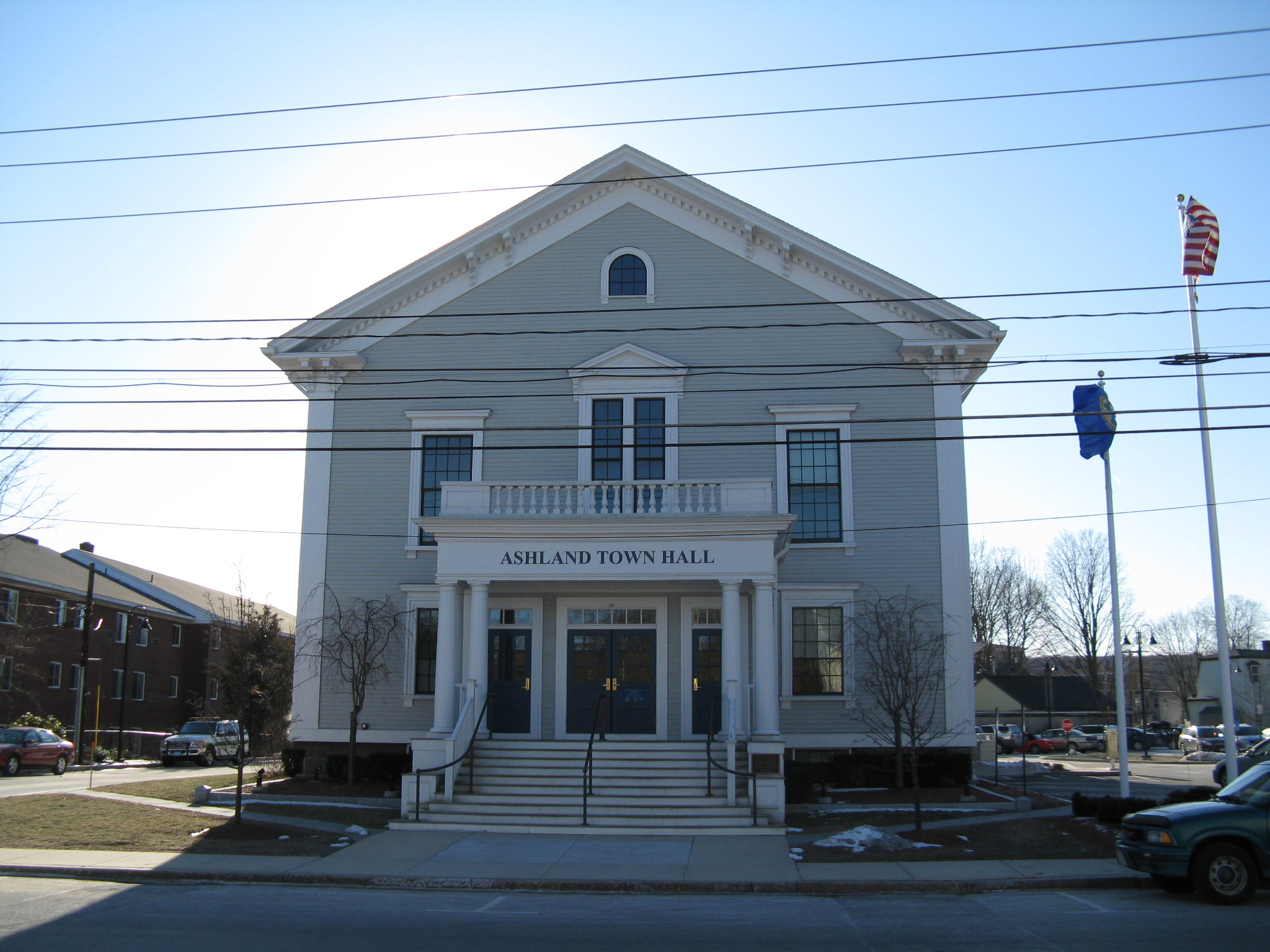
- Also known as Ashland Town Hall

- Location within Massachusetts Location within the United States
- Location: Ashland, Massachusetts
- Coordinates: 42°15′40.33″N 71°27′58.10″W
- Area: 1.5 acres (0.61 ha)
- Built: 1855
- Architect: Johnson, A.W.; et al.
- Architectural style: Greek Revival, Italianate
- NRHP reference No.: 04000120
- Added to NRHP: March 3, 2004

The Ashland Town House is the current town hall of Ashland, Massachusetts. It is located at 101 Main Street, in the town center. The 2 1/2-story wood-frame building was built in 1855, and has been used continuously for municipal purposes since then. It is a fine local example of Greek Revival architecture, with some Italianate and Colonial Revival details. The building was listed on the National Register of Historic Places in 2004.

== Description and history ==
The Ashland Town House stands on the west side of Main Street in the civic heart of the town, opposite the town's 1835 Congregational meeting house. It is a 2 1/2-story wood-frame structure, three bays wide and seven deep, with a front-facing gable roof, clapboard siding, and a granite foundation. The roof line is highlighted by dentil moulding and paired brackets in the Italianate style, the corners have broad pilasters, and the windows are decorated with projecting lintels above and tabs under the sills, also Italianate features. An entry vestibule, Colonial Revival in style, projects from the front; it was added in 1905 and restyled in 1981.

The town of Ashland was incorporated in 1846 out of portions of neighboring Hopkinton, Holliston, and Framingham. Its town meetings were at first held in a combination school and meeting hall built in 1830 by local mill owners. In 1851 the town began considering the construction of a town house, resulting in construction of the present structure in 1855 on the site of the previous building. Originally three bays wide and five deep, two additional bays extended its length in 1905. At the same time, the Colonial Revival portico was added to the front, augmenting its otherwise Italianate and Greek Revival features. The building continued to be used as a school as well, serving grade school students until 1928.

== See also ==
- National Register of Historic Places listings in Middlesex County, Massachusetts
