= Hopkinton Dam and Spillway =

- U.S. National Register of Historic Places
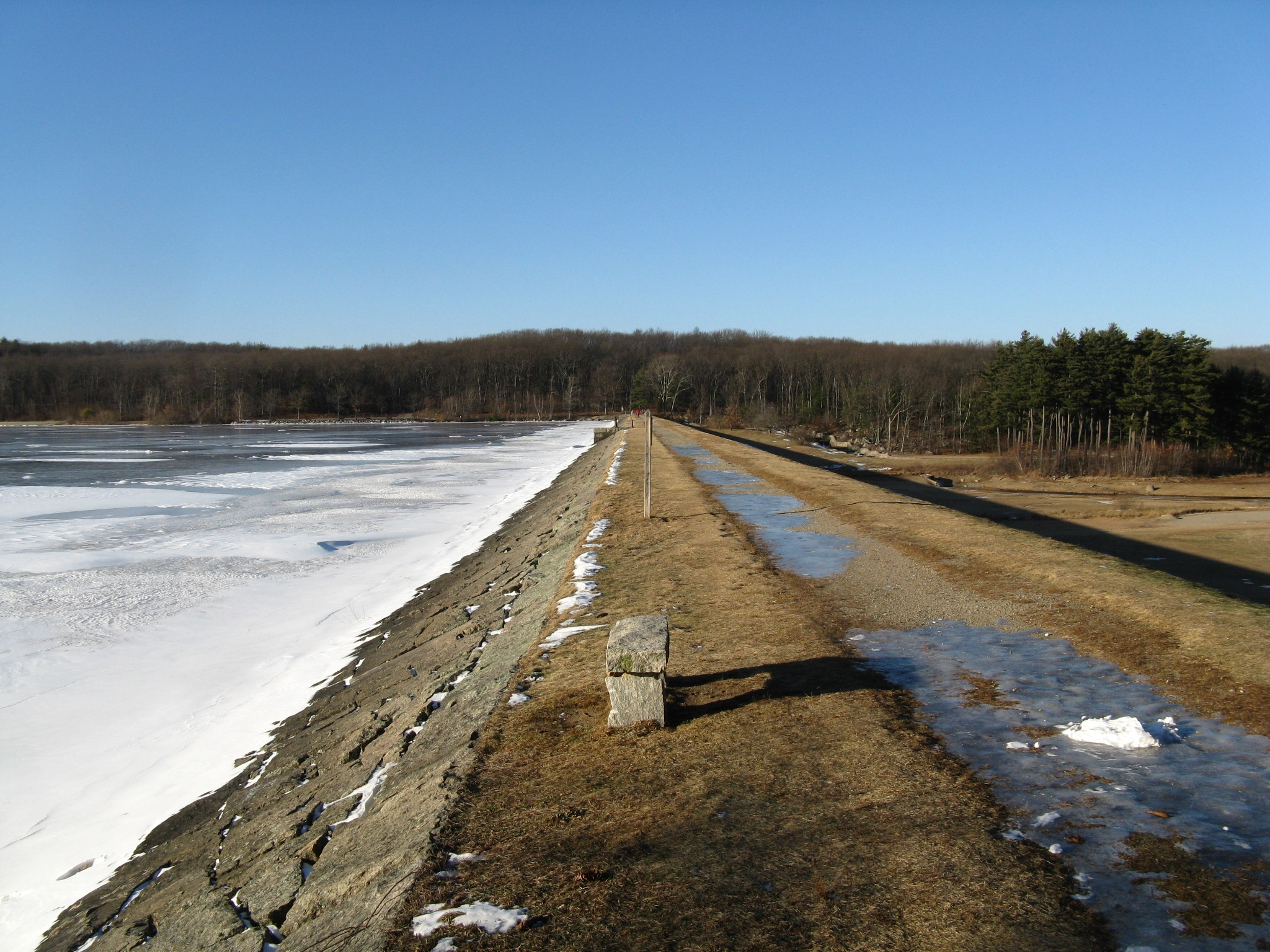
- Hopkinton Dam and Spillway

- Location within Massachusetts Location within the United States
- Location: Ashland, Massachusetts
- Coordinates: 42°15′25″N 71°30′40″W
- Area: 15 acres (6.1 ha)
- Built: 1891
- MPS: Water Supply System of Metropolitan Boston MPS
- NRHP reference No.: 89002288
- Added to NRHP: January 18, 1990

The Hopkinton Dam and Spillway is a historic site at the eastern end of Hopkinton Reservoir in Hopkinton State Park in Ashland, Massachusetts. The western end of the reservoir lies in the town of Hopkinton. The reservoir was constructed between 1891 and 1894 as part of the city of Boston's second major water works project, the impoundment of significant portions of the Sudbury River watershed. The Hopkinton Dam impounds Indian Brook, a Sudbury River tributary, creating the reservoir to its south. The core of the dam is concrete, with earthen embankments that are bermed on the water side, with rip-rap below. The spillway is at the northern end of the dam, and is a 650-foot (200 m) series of steps lined with granite set in concrete. Unlike other dams in the system, this one apparently never had gatehouses built above the chambers from which water flow is controlled.

The dam and spillway were listed on the National Register of Historic Places in 1990.

== See also ==
- National Register of Historic Places listings in Middlesex County, Massachusetts
