= Ashland Dam and Spillway =

- U.S. National Register of Historic Places
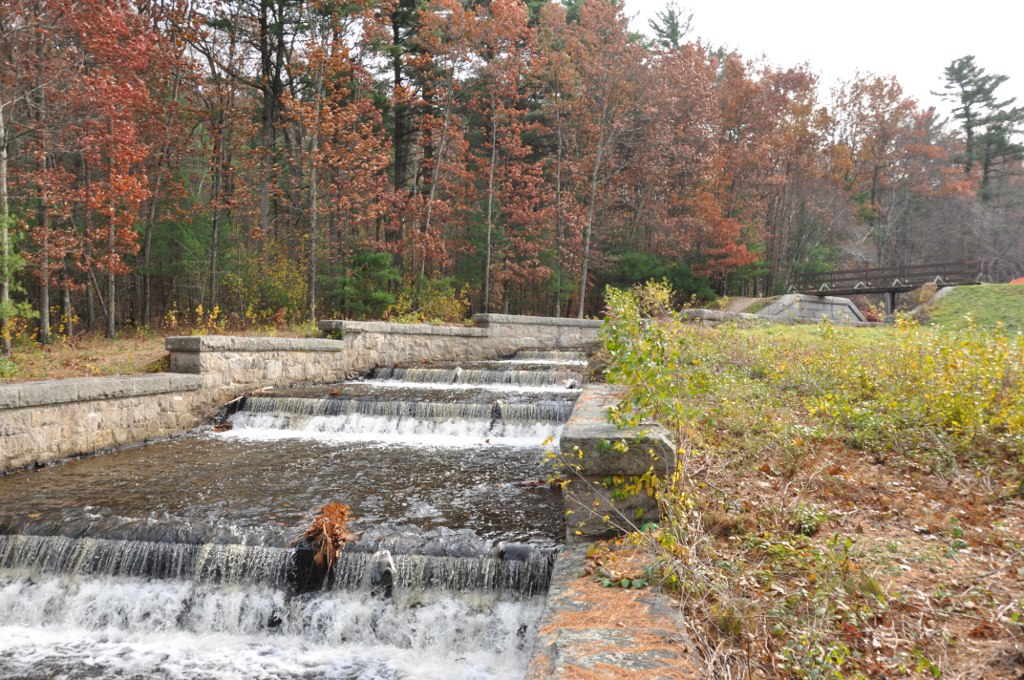

- Location within Massachusetts Location within the United States
- Location: Ashland, Massachusetts
- Coordinates: 42°14′46″N 71°27′37″W
- Area: 14 acres (5.7 ha)
- Built: 1885
- MPS: Water Supply System of Metropolitan Boston MPS
- NRHP reference No.: 89002289
- Added to NRHP: January 18, 1990

The Ashland Dam and Spillway is a historic site at the north end of Ashland Reservoir in Ashland State Park in Ashland, Massachusetts. Ashland Reservoir was constructed in 1885, impounding a portion of Cold Spring Brook, a tributary of the Sudbury River. The dam and spillway were built as part of Boston's second major water works effort, which impounded large portions of the upper Sudbury River. They were listed on the National Register of Historic Places in 1990.

== Description and history ==
The dam and spillway were built in Ashland, a rural outer suburb west of Boston, in 1885 as one of the later elements of Boston's second major water supply system. This system impounded large sections of the Sudbury River, primarily in Framingham, from where the water was piped toward Boston via the Sudbury Aqueduct. Water impounded by the Ashland dam was originally fed to the aqueduct by a pair of 48-inch (120 cm) pipes.

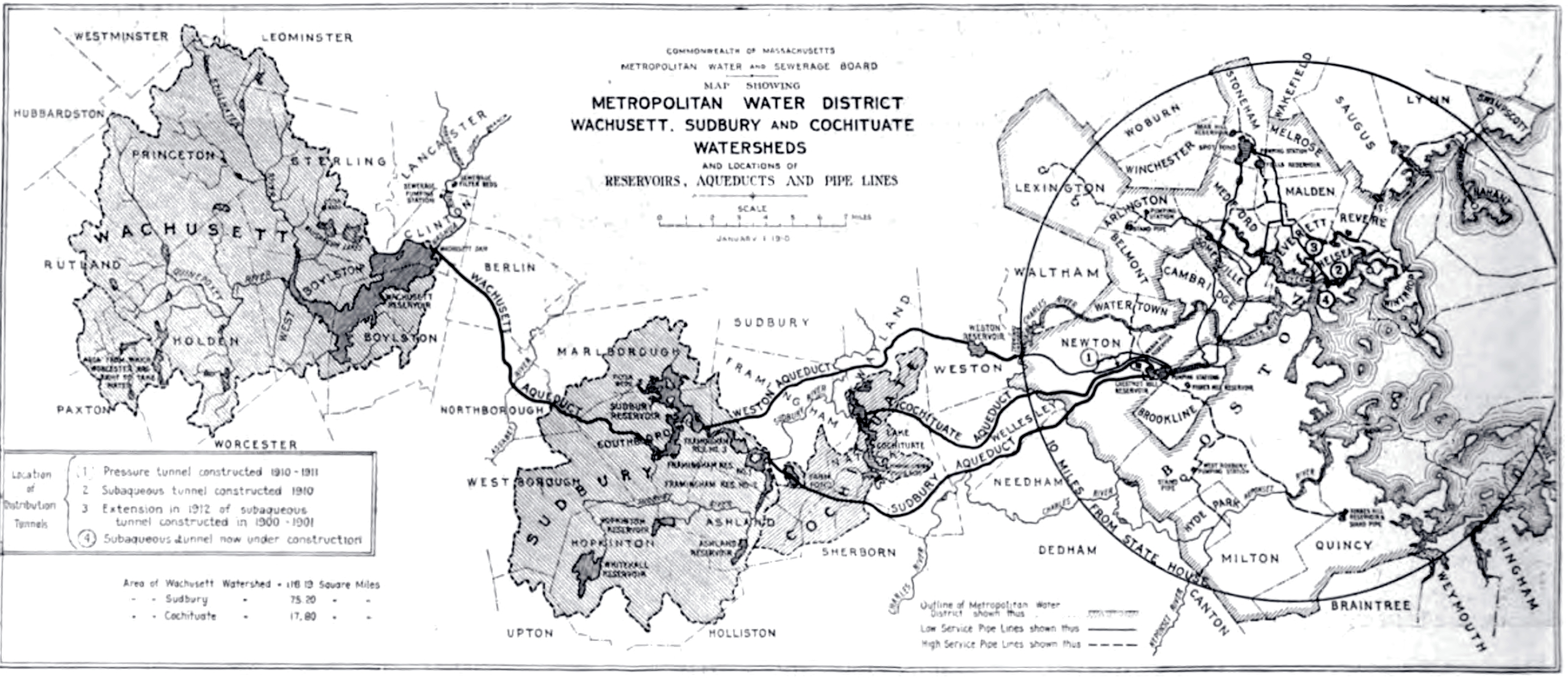
A 1910 map of the Metropolitan Water District system supplying Boston, with Ashland at lower-center

The dam is an earthen embankment, built 83 feet (25 m) above bedrock and 54 feet (16 m) above the level of the reservoir. There is a concrete core wall about 8 feet (2.4 m) thick at the bottom and 2.5 feet (0.76 m) at the top. The spillway lies at the eastern end of the dam, and is constructed of granite rubble, and a series of steps made of granite laid in concrete. The spillway is 630 feet (190 m) long, and is naturalistically designed to resemble a brook descending through landscape. Water exiting the spillway flows north in Cold Spring Brook to join a branch of the Sudbury River.

By 1927, the reservoir was part of the system's backup elements, and a pipe was laid to feed its water into the Sudbury Reservoir; this pipe was never used. The Ashland reservoir was taken out of service in 1947; along with surrounding land, it was turned over to the state and became Ashland State Park.

The dam was originally topped by a gatehouse; it was demolished in 1976 after repeated vandalism. In 1990, the dam and spillway were added to the National Register of Historic Places.

The park, with dam and spillway at its northern end, is administered by the Massachusetts Department of Conservation and Recreation.

== See also ==
- National Register of Historic Places listings in Middlesex County, Massachusetts
