= Sri Lakshmi Temple, Ashland, Massachusetts =

Sri Lakshmi Temple
- ஶ்ரீ லக்‌ஷ்மி கோவில்
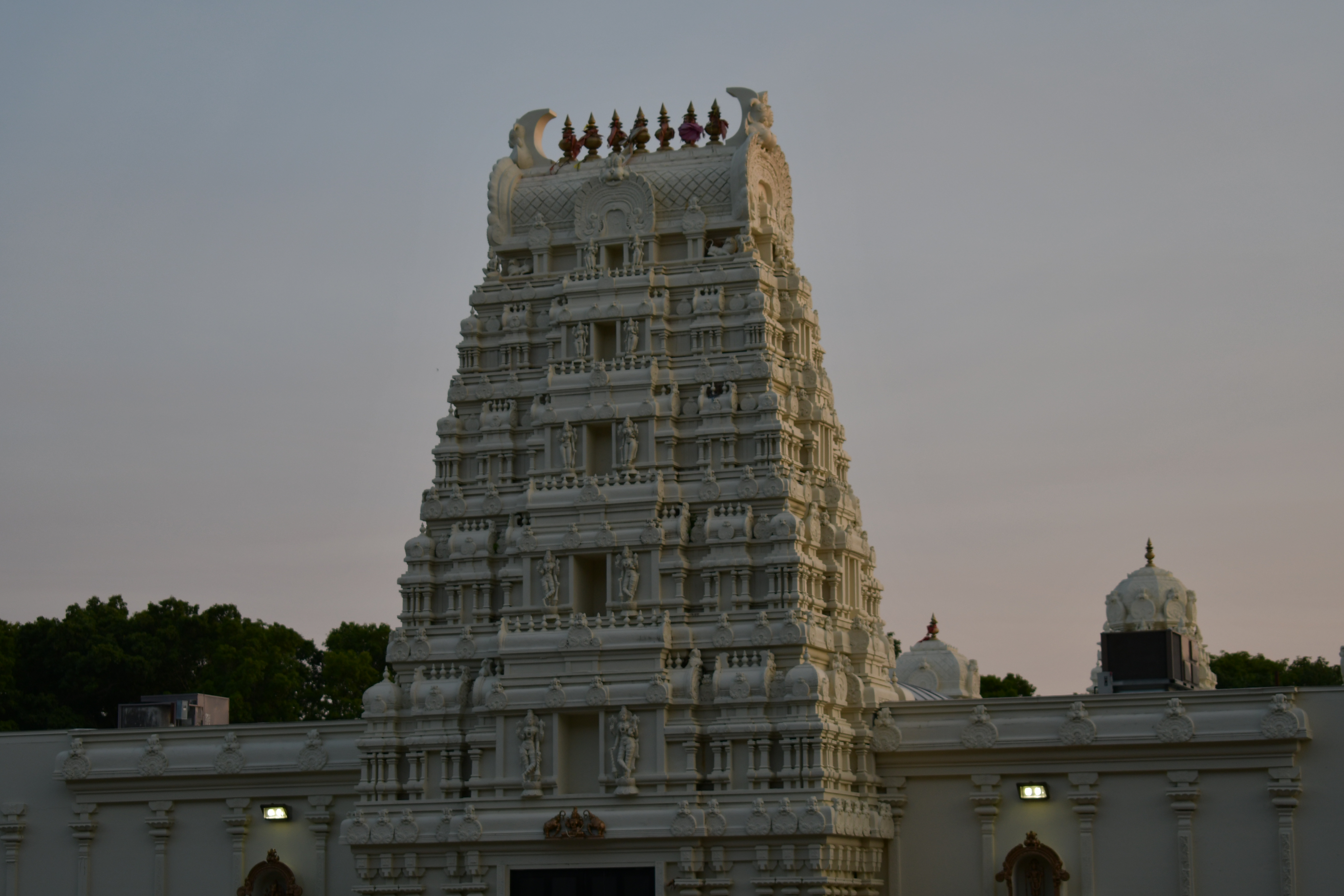

- Location within Massachusetts

Religion
- Affiliation: Hinduism
- Deity: Lakshmi
- Governing body: New England Hindu Temple, Inc. (NEHTI)

Location
- Location: 117 Waverly Street, Ashland, Massachusetts, 01721
- State: Massachusetts
- Country: United States
- Coordinates: 42°16′7.3308″N 71°26′34.32″W

Architecture
- Architect: Ganapathy Sthapati
- Type: Vastu Shastra
- Established: 1978
- Groundbreaking: 19 June 1984
- Completed: May 1990 (consecration)

Website
- https://srilakshmi.org/

The Sri Lakshmi Temple in Ashland, Massachusetts, also known as the New England Hindu Temple, Inc. (NEHTI), is New England’s first traditional Hindu temple. The temple was inaugurated in 1990 by priests from India, the United States, and Britain. Following the inauguration in 1990, the temple was expanded in 2005 and 2018. The central deity worshiped is Lakshmi, the Hindu Goddess of prosperity and abundance.

== History ==
While South Asians began migrating to the United States towards the end of the 19th century and the early 20th century, they did not come in significant numbers until the latter half of the 20th century. In 1978, a small group of Hindu Indian immigrant families residing in the Boston metropolitan area began offering prayers and worship together. The group formed a formal organization, known as the New England Hindu Temple, Inc., and began arranging weekly spiritual assemblies at the Knights of Columbus Hall in Melrose, Massachusetts.

Weekly gatherings inspired the organization of devotees to create a Hindu temple as a permanent place of worship for them. A committee of members pledged $101 each towards the construction of a traditional Hindu temple in New England. On 28 October 1978, in Melrose, Massachusetts, the committee announced their plans to build a temple.

In 1981, the New England Hindu Temple, Inc. purchased 12 acres of land on Waverly Street in Ashland, Massachusetts to construct a temple.

Ganapathy Sthapathi, an architect from the Institute of Architecture and Sculpture in Tamil Nadu, developed the designs for the temple in accordance with the Hindu scriptures. Sthapathi has supported the creation of numerous Hindu temples across the United States.

On 19 June 1984, the groundbreaking ceremony for the temple was completed with Hindu rites to sanctify the land that the temple would be built on.

In June 1985, the temple committee applied for a loan with the Thirumala-Tirupati Devasthanams (TTD), a private trust based in India that manages Hindu temples around the world. The TTD accepted the application and distributed the funds to New England Hindu Temple, Inc.

In 1986, the exterior stone cladding was completed. Although the construction of the temple’s interior was in progress, the temple held an initial consecration celebration. As long as the interior remained incomplete, weekly worship was conducted at the Needham Village Club. By 1989, construction of the entire temple was completed, and a four-day grand opening ceremony took place in May 1990. The temple is more commonly known as the Sri Lakshmi Temple because it is dedicated to Lakshmi, the Hindu deity associated with prosperity.

=== Consecration ceremonies ===
In September 1986, the first consecration ceremony was held upon completion of the temple’s outer walls.

In May 1990, the temple organized a grand opening ceremony for the fully completed temple. The week-long ceremony began with the Ganesha Puja, dedicated to Ganesha, who Hindus consider the remover of obstacles and who is honored at the beginning of auspicious events.

Hindu priests from India, Britain, and the United States performed the rituals to welcome the Hindu deities. At the end of the week, priests carried large pots of water, which contained water from the Ganges River in India, and the Mississippi, Missouri, and Colorado Rivers, around the temple and poured the water over the towers of the temple. The final ritual was performed when the priests poured water and milk over the sacred images of the deities and the deities were cleansed and dressed. Devotees and well-wishers had their first glimpses of the newly consecrated deities upon completion of the rituals.

== Deities ==
The administrators, founders, and devotees of the temple collectively believed that the United States had brought good fortune and happiness into their lives, therefore, Lakshmi, the goddess of prosperity, was chosen to be the central deity.

The other deities at the temple include Ganesha, Balaji, Nataraja and Parvati, Subramanya, Valli and, Deivaanai, Navagrahas, Hanuman, Swami Ayyappa, and Garuda.

== Gallery ==
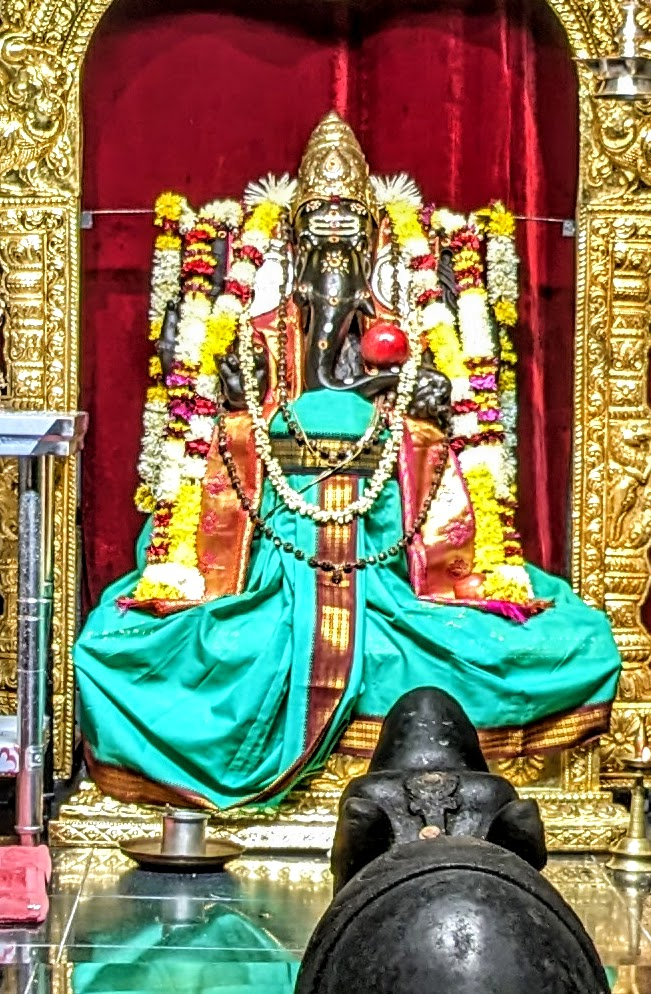
Ganesha

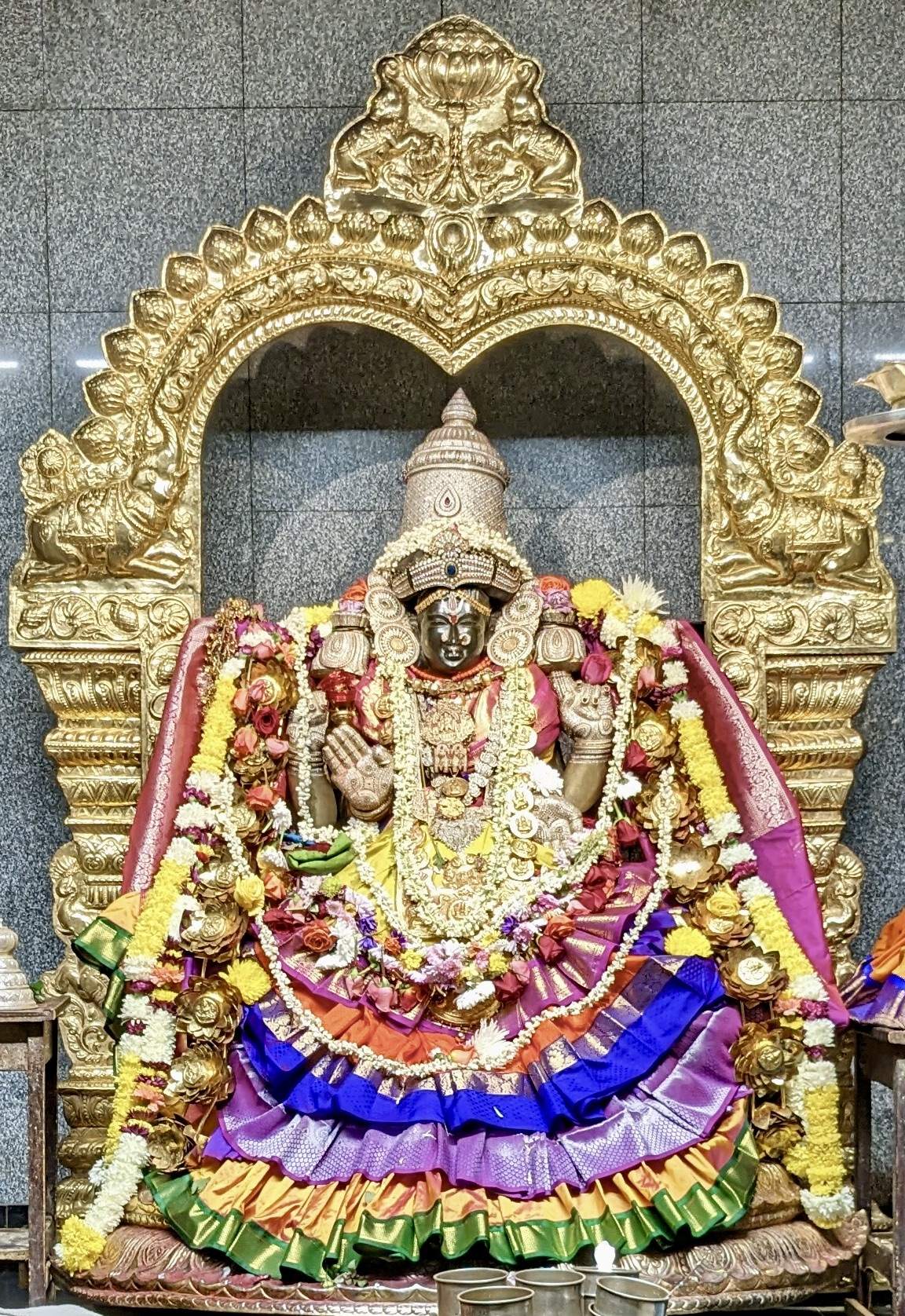
Sri Lakshmi

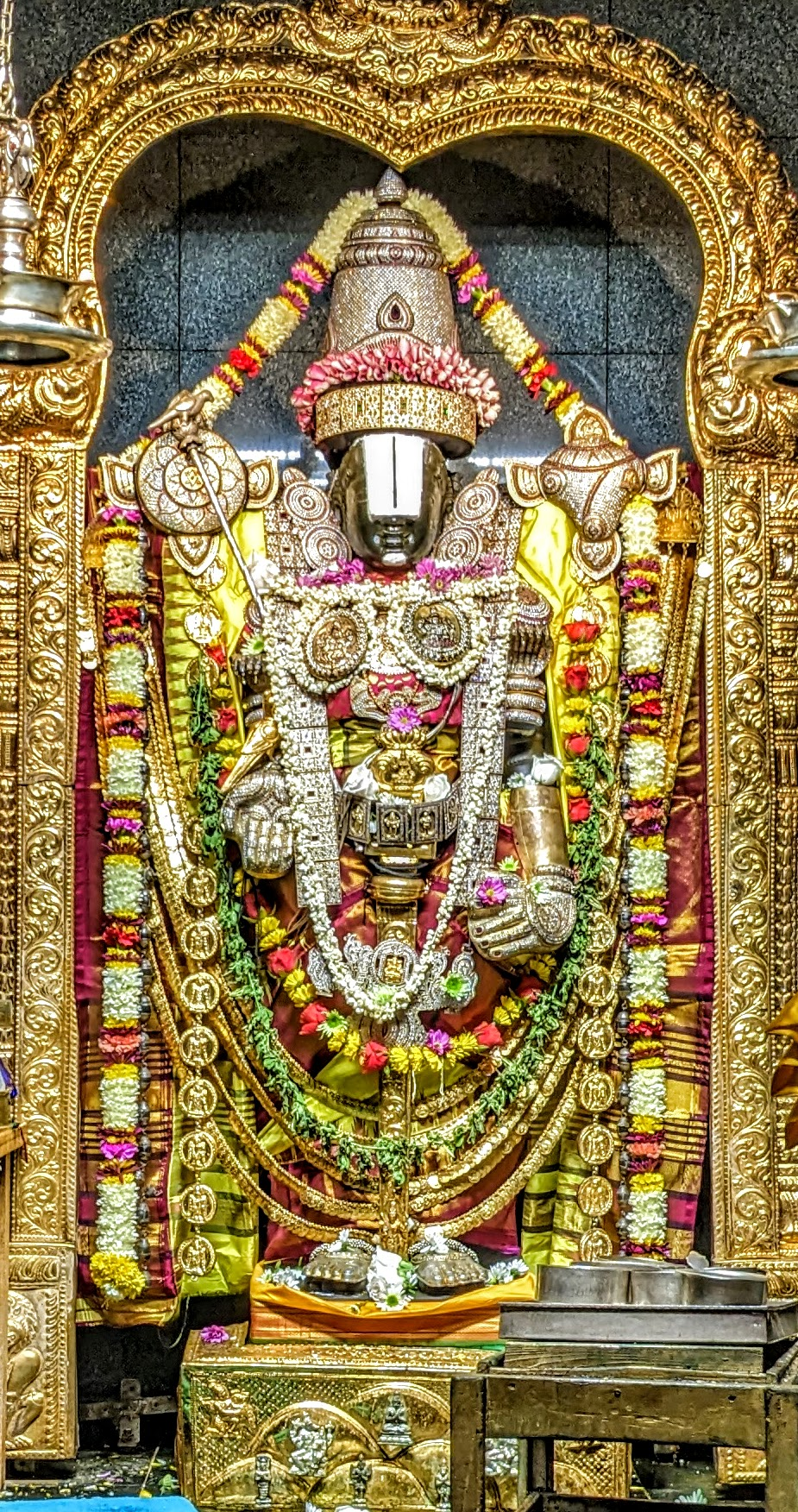
Balaji

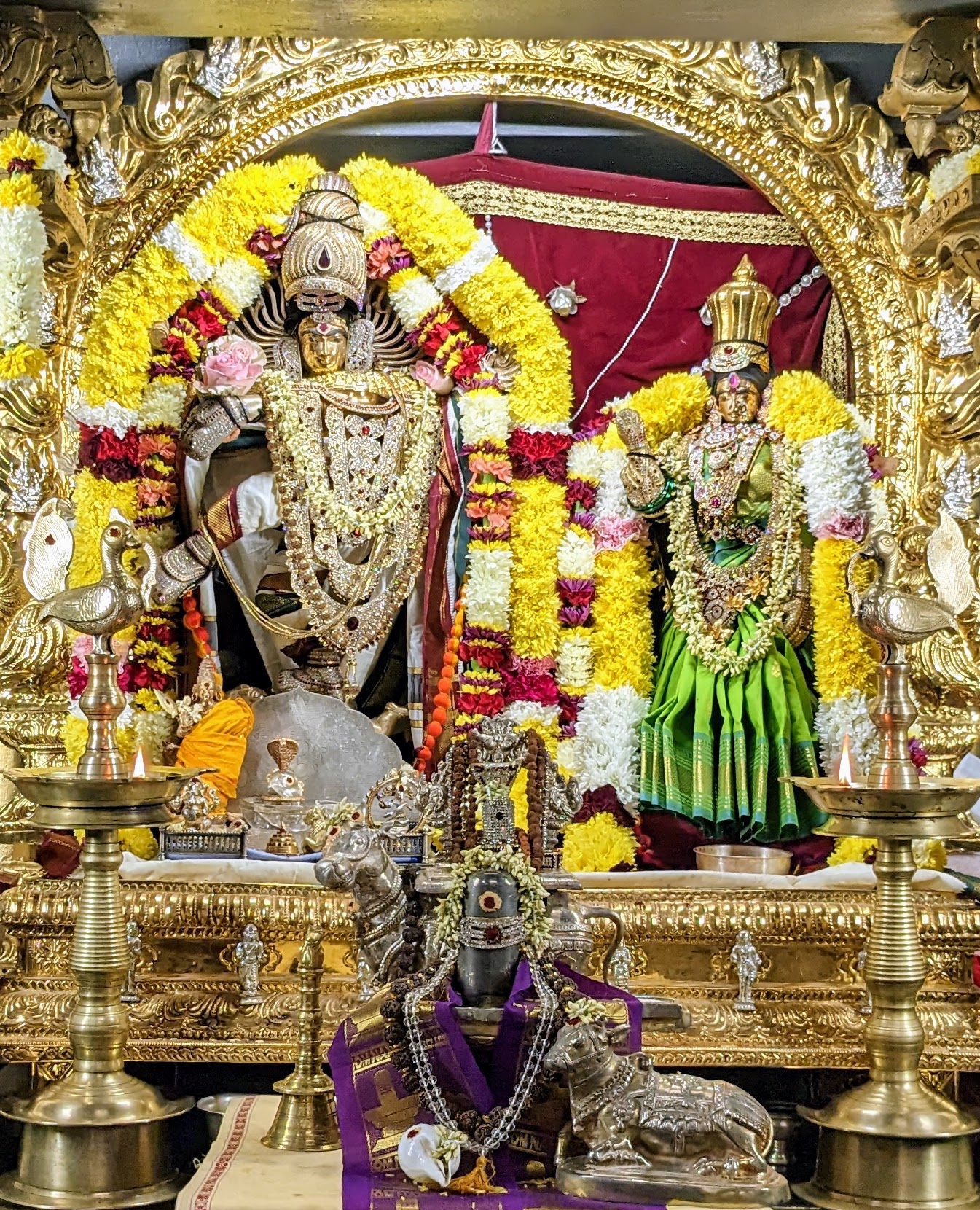
Nataraja and Parvati

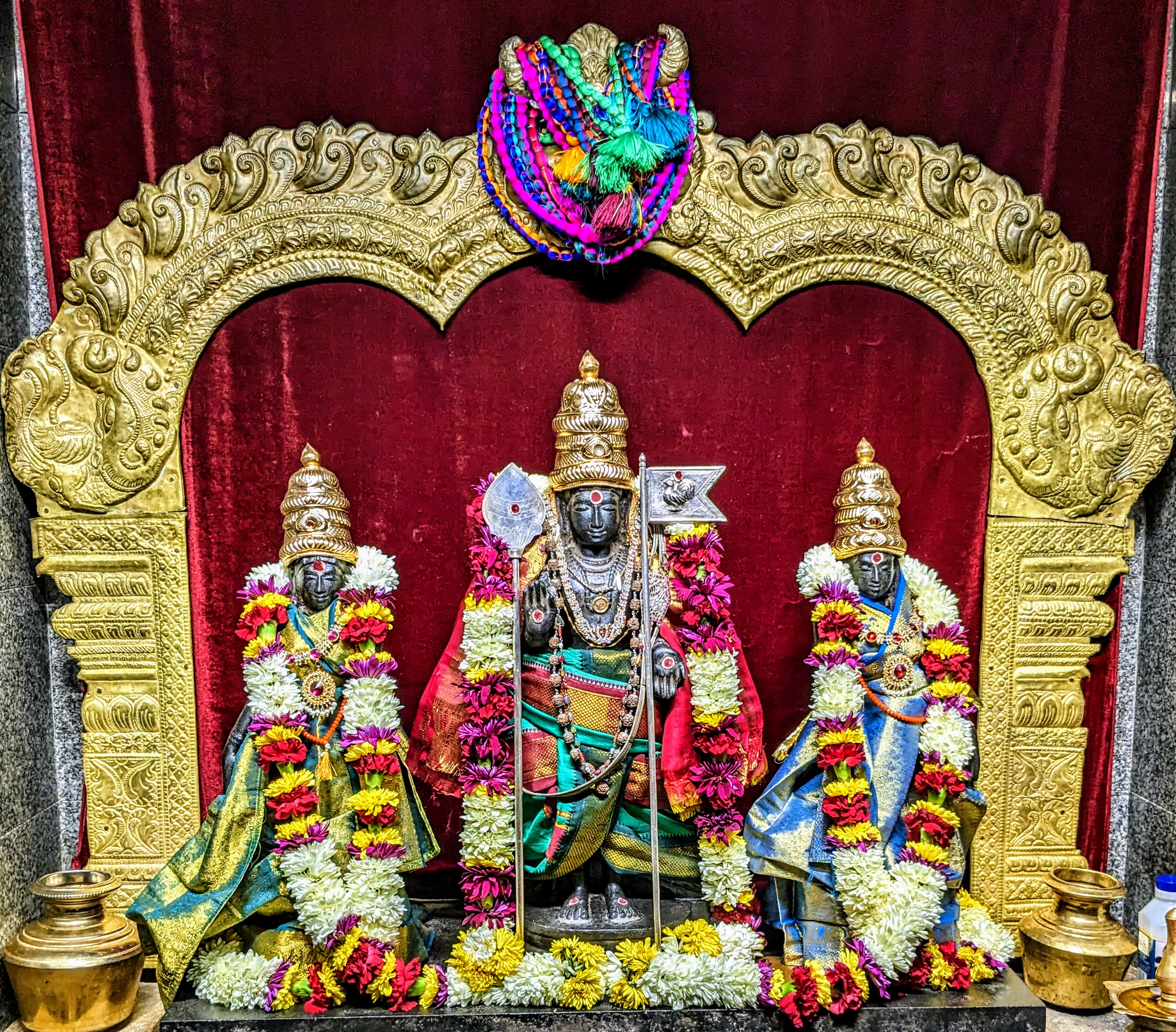
Subramanya, Valli, and Deivaanai

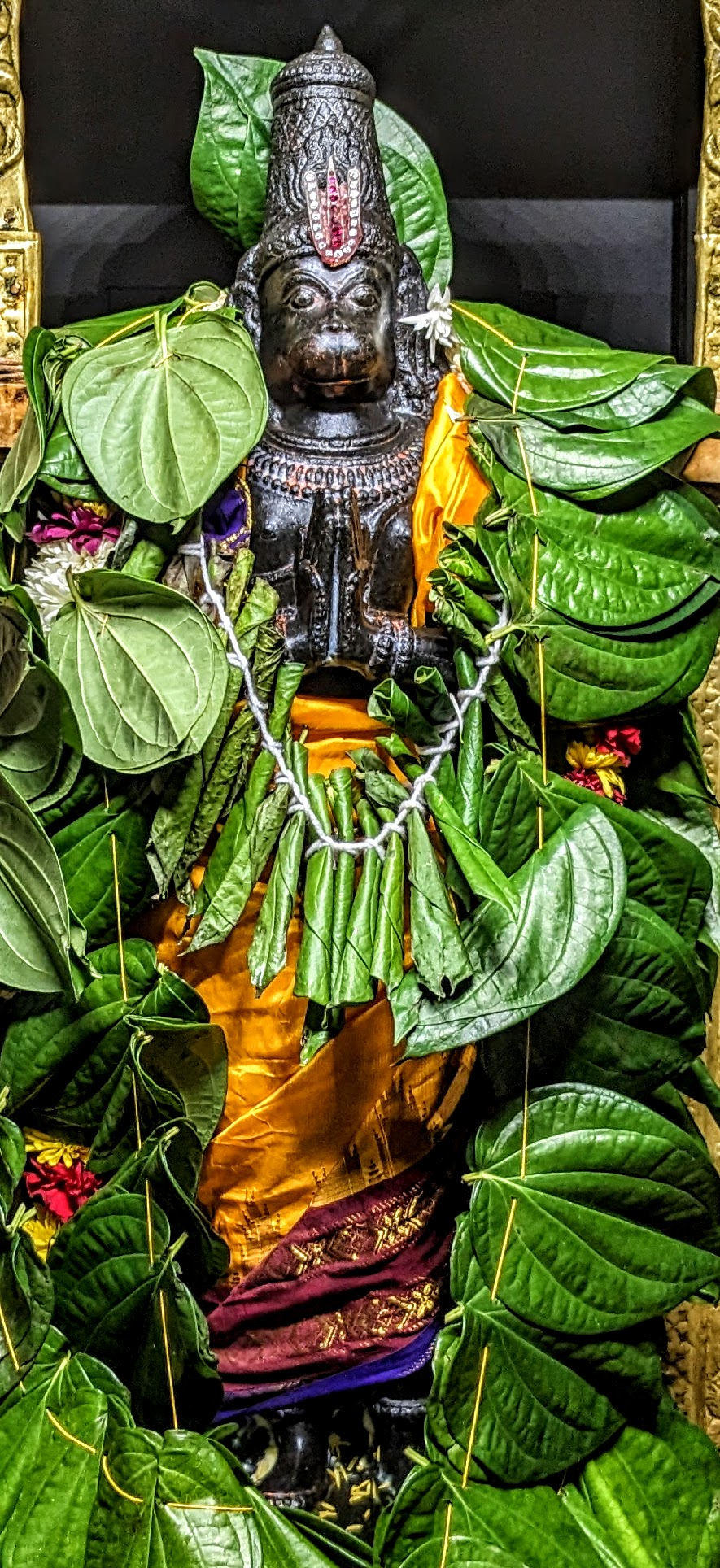
Hanuman

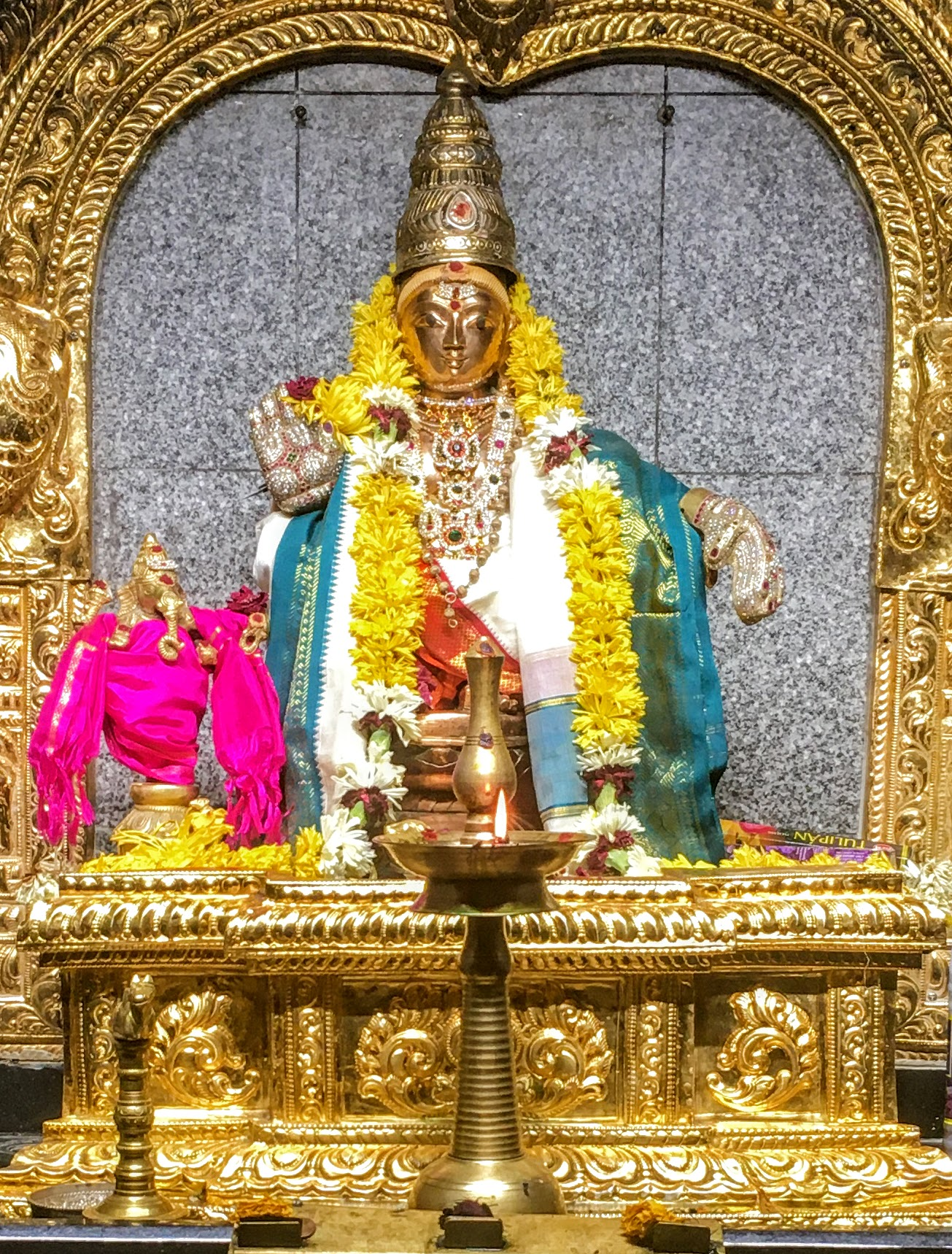
Ayyappa

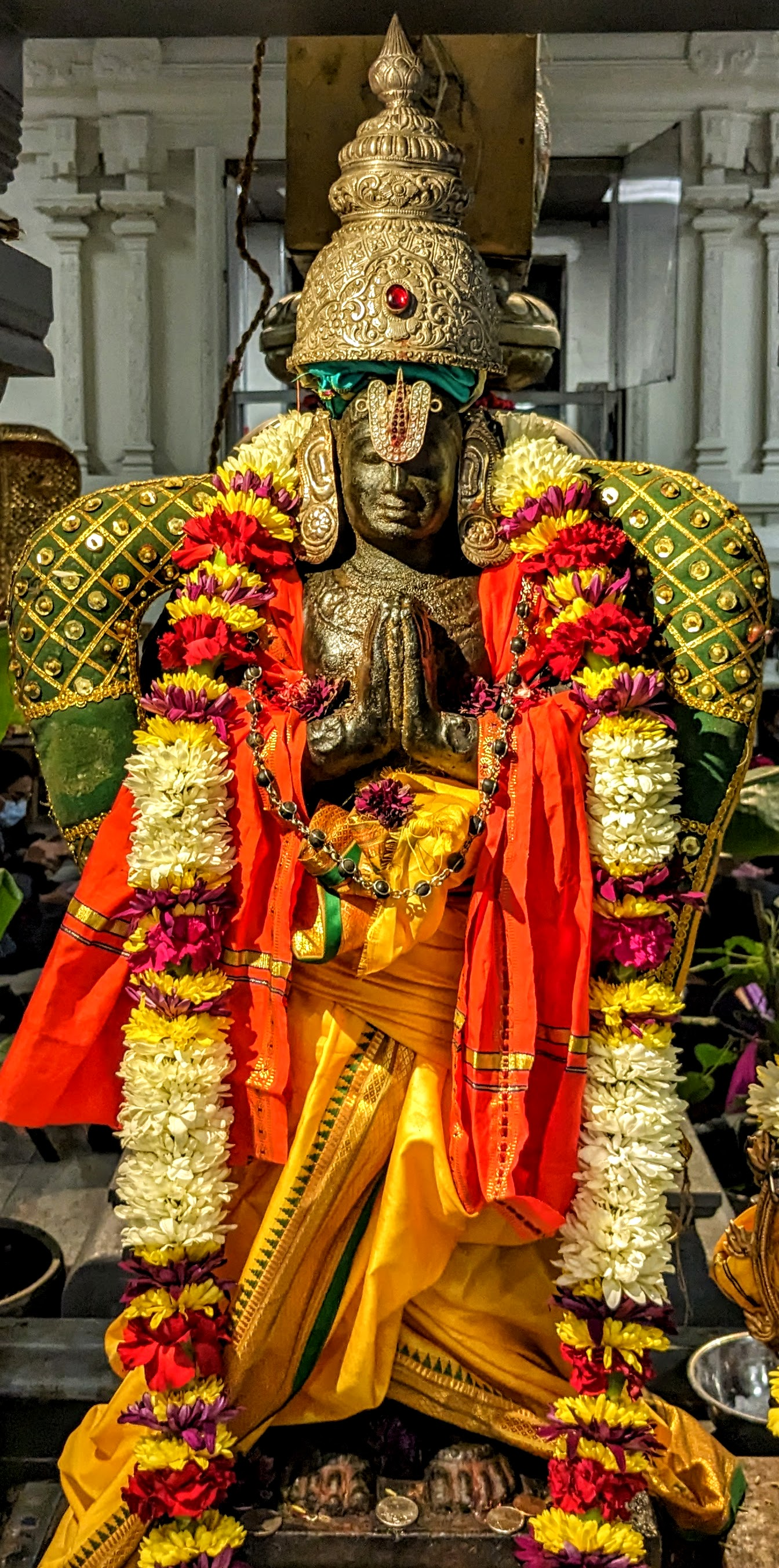
Garuda

== Temple rituals ==
=== Daily rituals ===
Daily rituals honoring the deities in the temple are conducted by priests.

Daily rituals include: the Venkateswara Suprabhatam, Navagraha Abhishekam, Sri Subramanya Abhishekam, Sri Ganesha Abhishekam, Sri Shiva (Atmalinga) Abhishekam, Sri Lakshmi Aarti, and Ekanda Seva.

=== Weekly rituals ===
A variety of rituals are performed throughout the week.

Every Monday, the Sri Rudra Abhishekam occurs. On Tuesday, the Sri Lalitha Sahasranama Kumkuma Archana takes place. On Friday, both the Sri Mahalakshmi Abhishekam and Sri Mahalakshmi Sahasranama Archana occurs. Every Saturday, the Suprabatham, Sri Venkateswara Abhishekam, and Alankaram occur. Every Sunday, the Sri Vishnu Sahasranama Parayanam is organized.

== Temple expansion ==
Following the first expansion in 2005, a larger 16,000 square foot expansion took place to expand the facilities in 2018. After completion of the second expansion, the temple held a renewal consecration ceremony.

The expansion project provided the temple with a new auditorium, boardroom, library, commercial kitchen, and dining area for devotees, visitors, and staff.

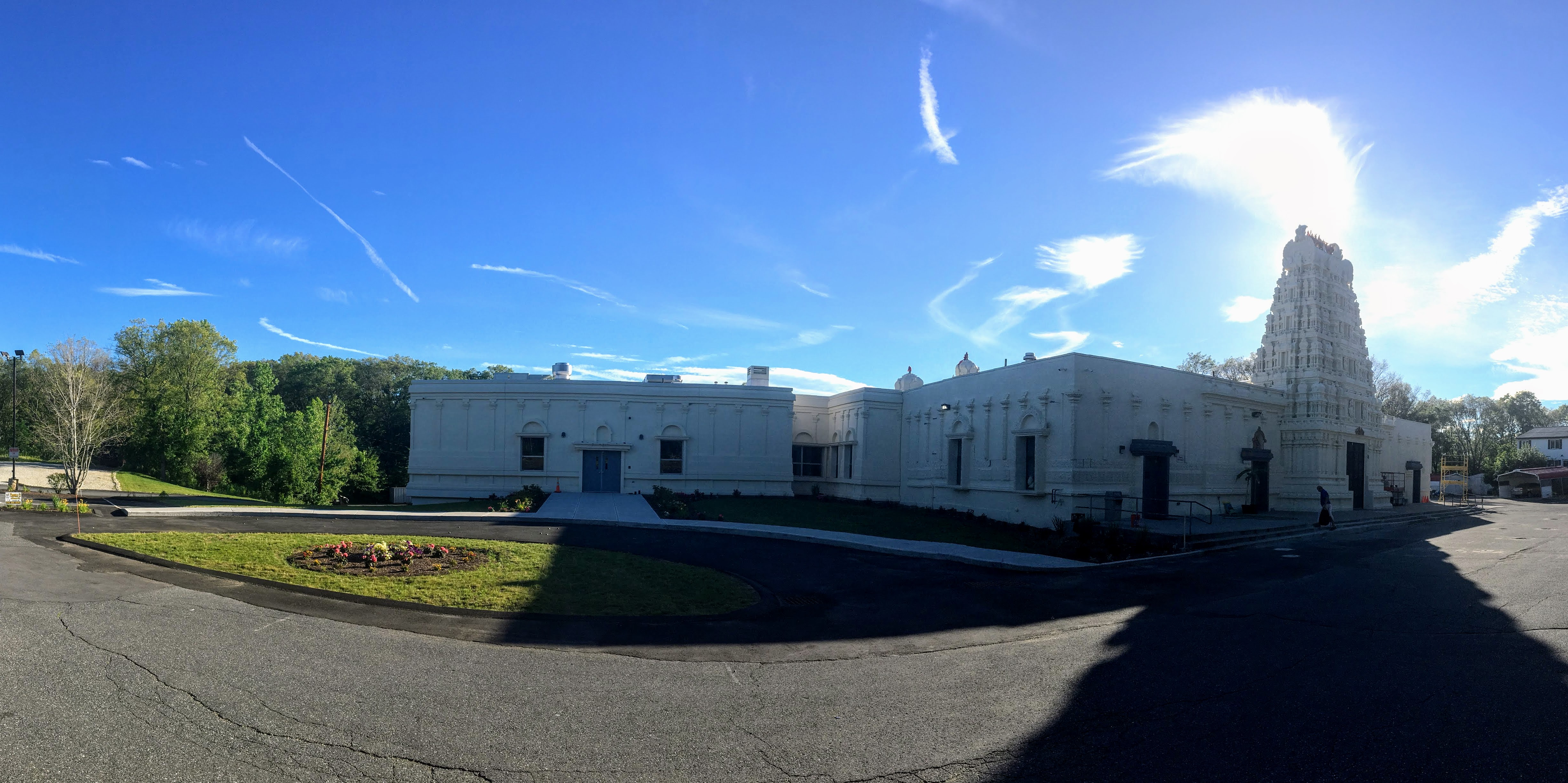
Sri Lakshmi Temple with the new annex building on the left

== Encounters with hate crime and vandalism ==
=== Hate crime in 2003 ===
A 17-year-old male, spray-painted racial slurs and threw tissue paper on the temple’s property on the night of 31 October 2003.

In November 2003, the vandal was charged with destruction or threats to a place of worship, causing more than $5,000 worth of damage, malicious destruction of property of more than $250, tagging, and a civil rights violation.

=== Vandalism in 2007 ===
After incidents in July and August 2007, six teenagers were charged with throwing Molotov cocktail-type devices in the temple's parking lot. The act of vandalism caused more than $12,000 in damage to the temple’s property.

The police and the temple officials determined that these acts were not hate crimes directed at the temple, but rather, random acts of vandalism.
