= Hopkinton State Park =

State park in Massachusetts, United States

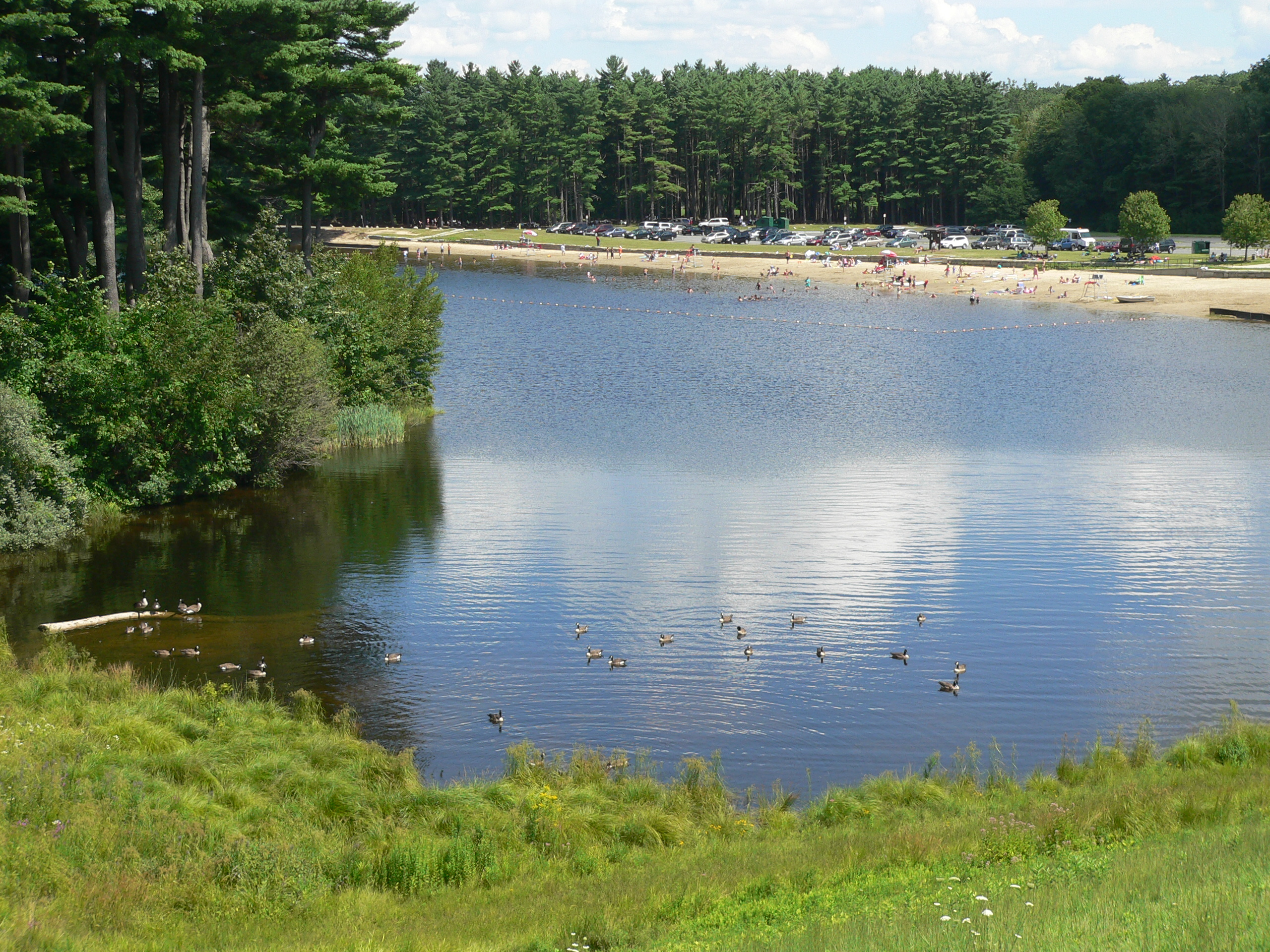
- Bathing pond

- Location within Massachusetts Location within the United States
- Location: Hopkinton and Ashland, Massachusetts, United States
- Coordinates: 42°15′30″N 71°30′22″W
- Area: 1,245 acres (504 ha)
- Elevation: 256 ft (78 m)
- Established: 1947
- Administrator: Massachusetts Department of Conservation and Recreation
- Website: Official website

Hopkinton State Park is a Massachusetts state park located in the towns of Hopkinton and Ashland and managed by the Department of Conservation and Recreation. The park was created in 1947 after the Hopkinton Reservoir was removed from service as a water source for the Greater Boston area. The park's dam and spillway were listed on the National Register of Historic Places in 1990. In 2010, it was named as one of the 1,000 places to visit by the Great Places in Massachusetts Commission.

== Activities and amenities ==
The park features beaches and a bathing pond for swimming that is physically separated from Hopkinton Reservoir, where nonmotorized boating is permitted. There are seasonal facilities for kayak and canoe rental. Park trails may be used for hiking, mountain biking, horseback riding, cross-country skiing, and snowmobiling. There is also a camp for children and teenagers that teaches sailing, kayaking, canoeing, stand up paddle boarding and windsurfing. Picnicking, restrooms, and fishing are also features of the park.

== Gallery ==
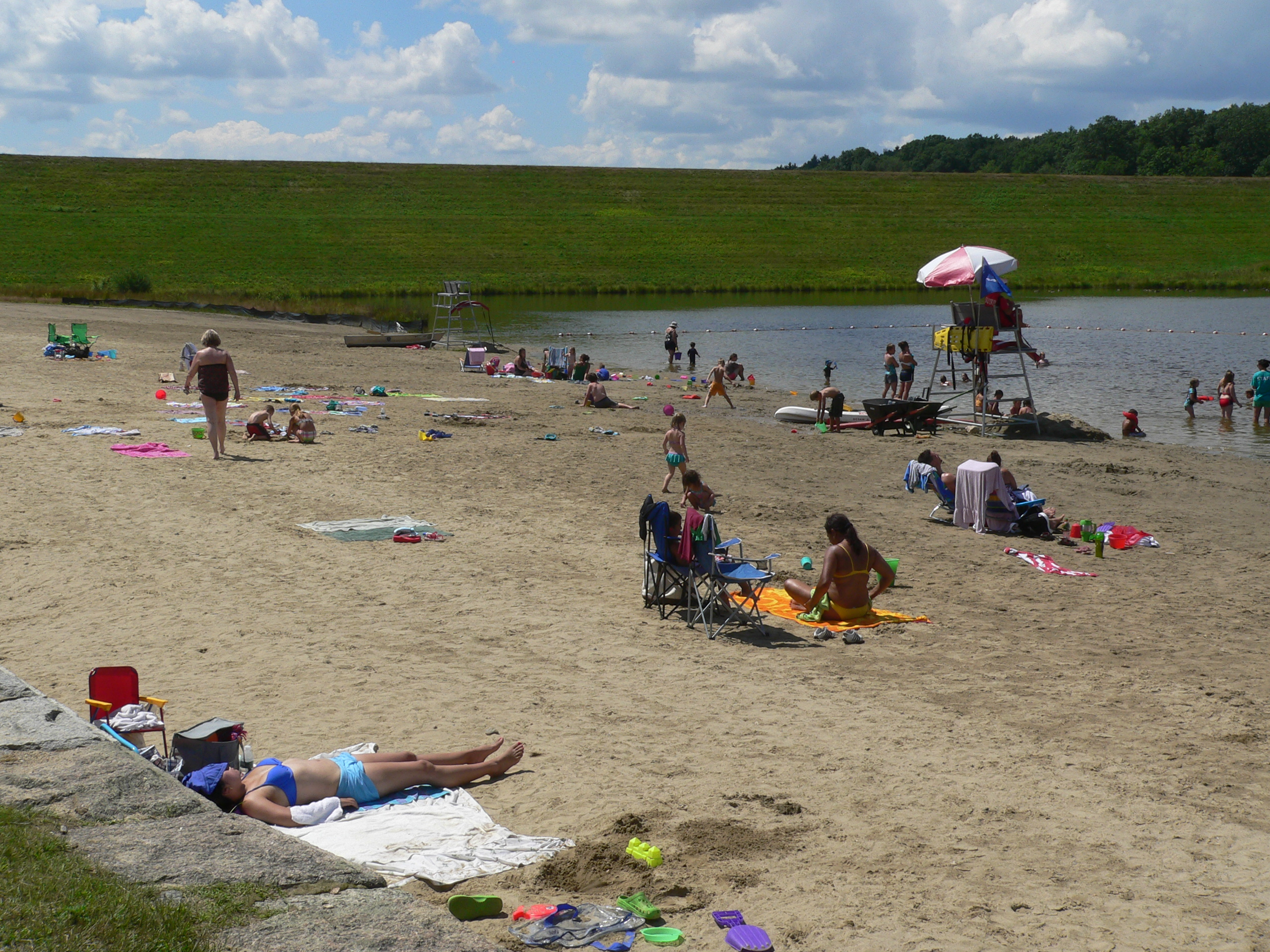
Swimming beach in bathing pond below dam

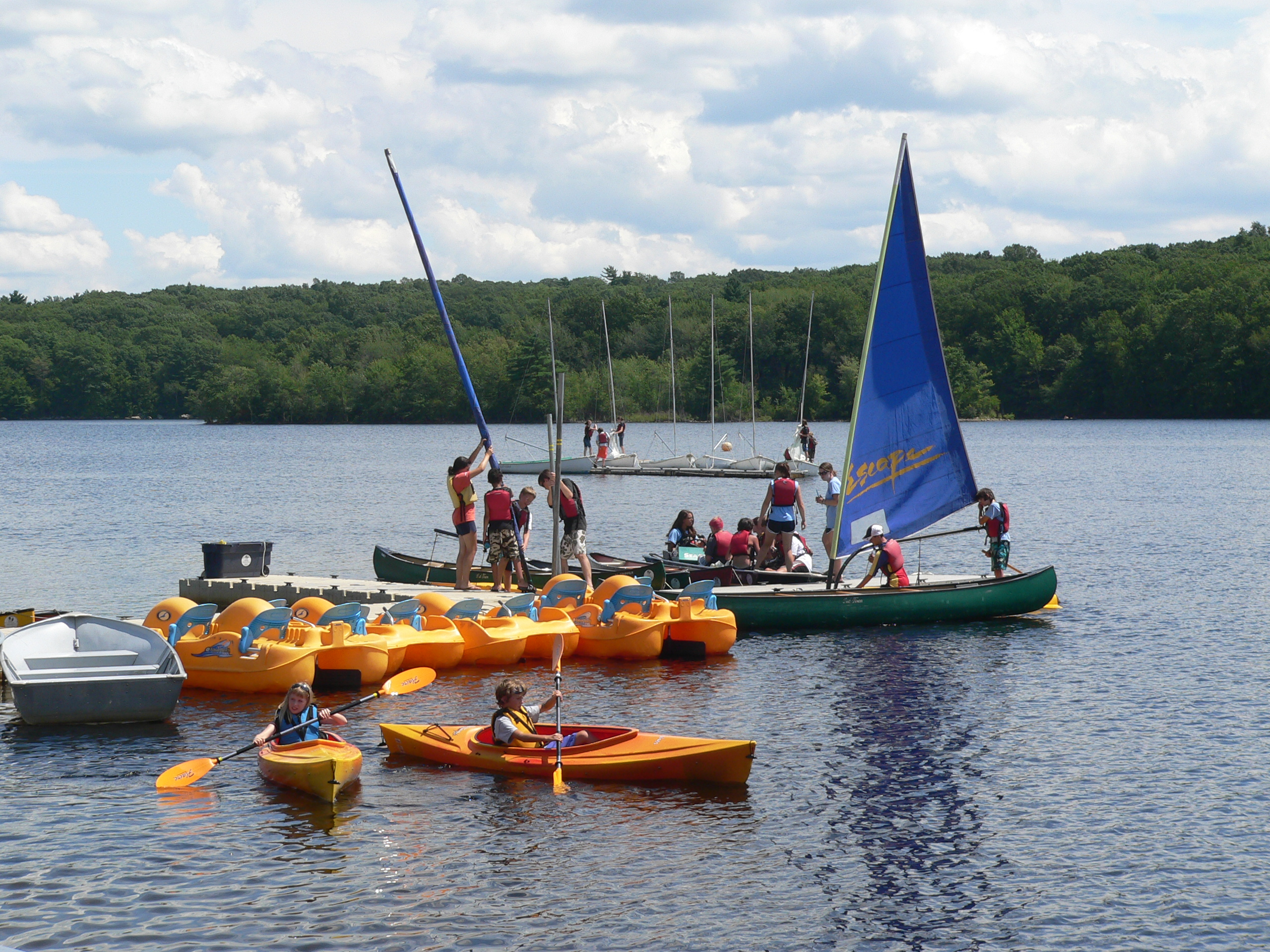
Boats in reservoir

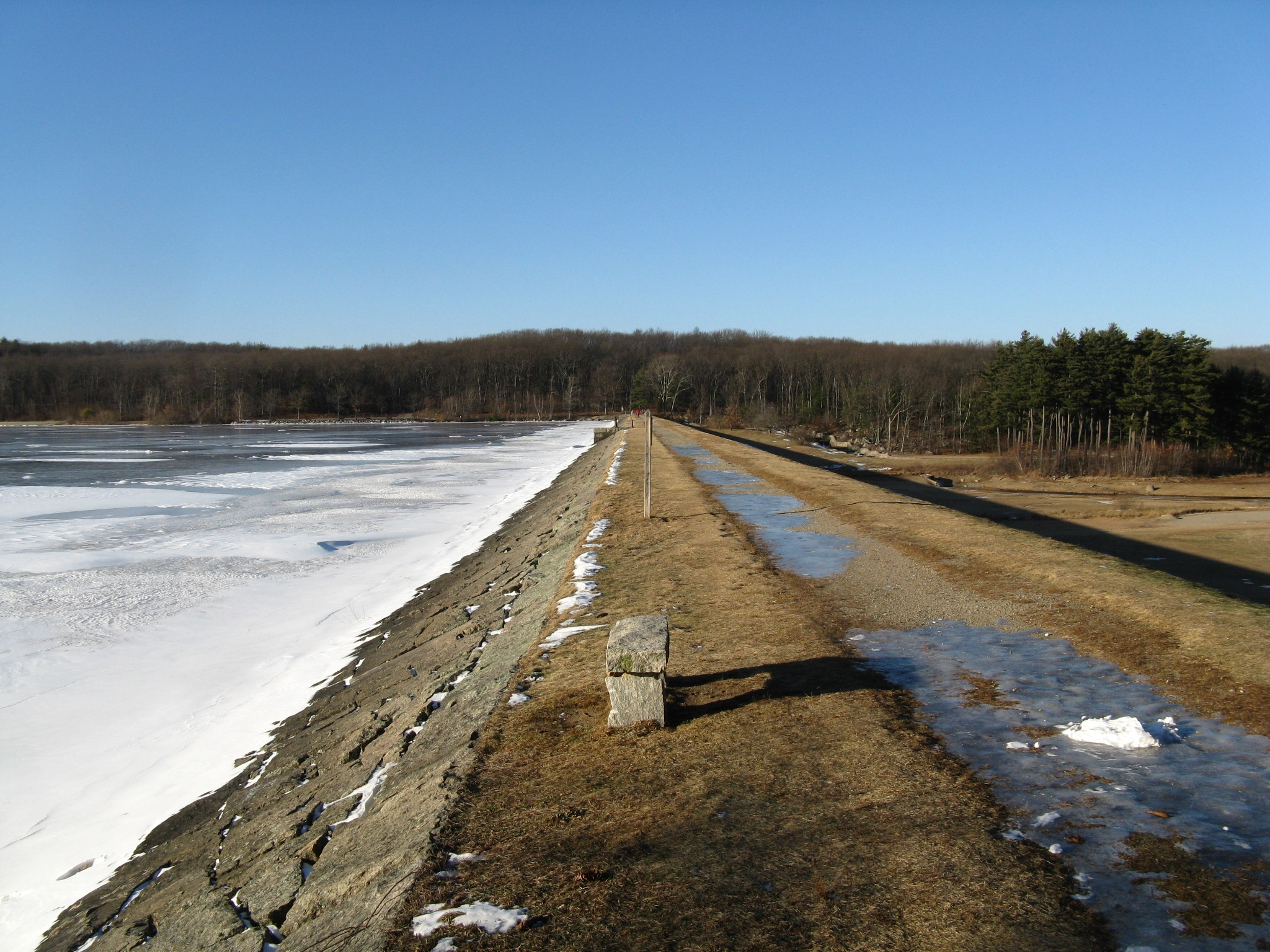
Reservoir and dam in winter
