= Ashland State Park =

State park in Middlesex County, Massachusetts

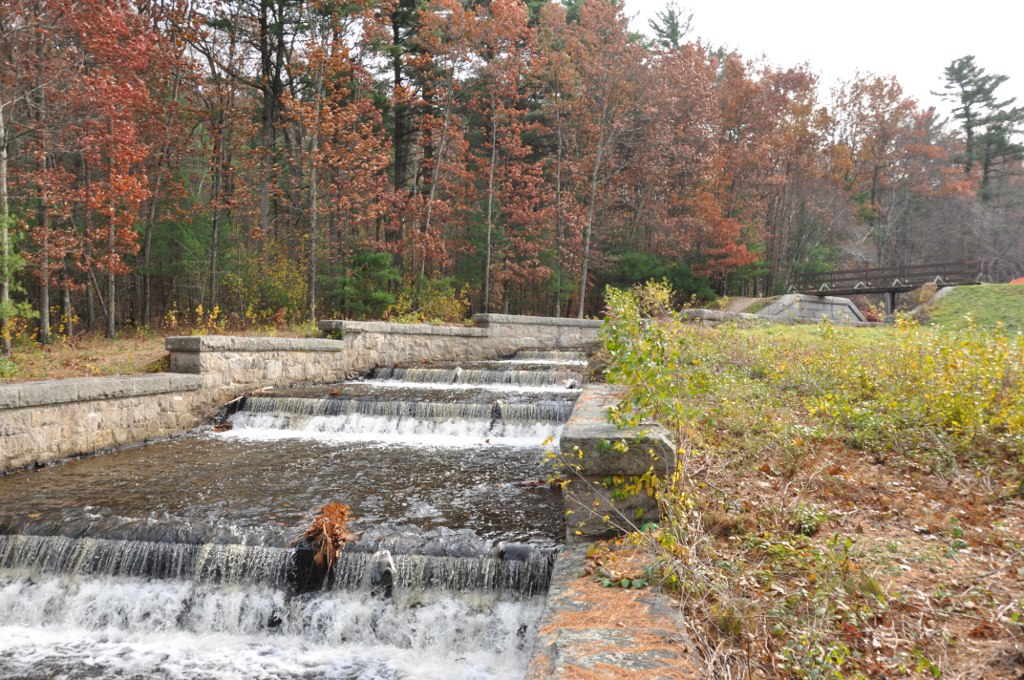
- The spillway below the reservoir dam

- Location within Massachusetts Location within the United States
- Interactive map of Ashland State Park
- Location: Ashland, Massachusetts, United States
- Coordinates: 42°14′25″N 71°27′54″W
- Area: 472 acres (191 ha)
- Elevation: 217 ft (66 m)
- Authorized: 1947
- Administrator: Massachusetts Department of Conservation and Recreation
- Website: Official website

Ashland State Park is a public recreation area surrounding the 157-acre (64 ha) Ashland Reservoir in the town of Ashland, Massachusetts. The state park's 470 acres (190 ha) incorporate the entire shoreline of the reservoir, which is abutted by the Warren Conference Center and Inn of Framingham State University, town-owned land once the site of Camp Winnetaska (a Girl Scouts camp), and residential houses. The park is managed by the Massachusetts Department of Conservation and Recreation.

== History ==
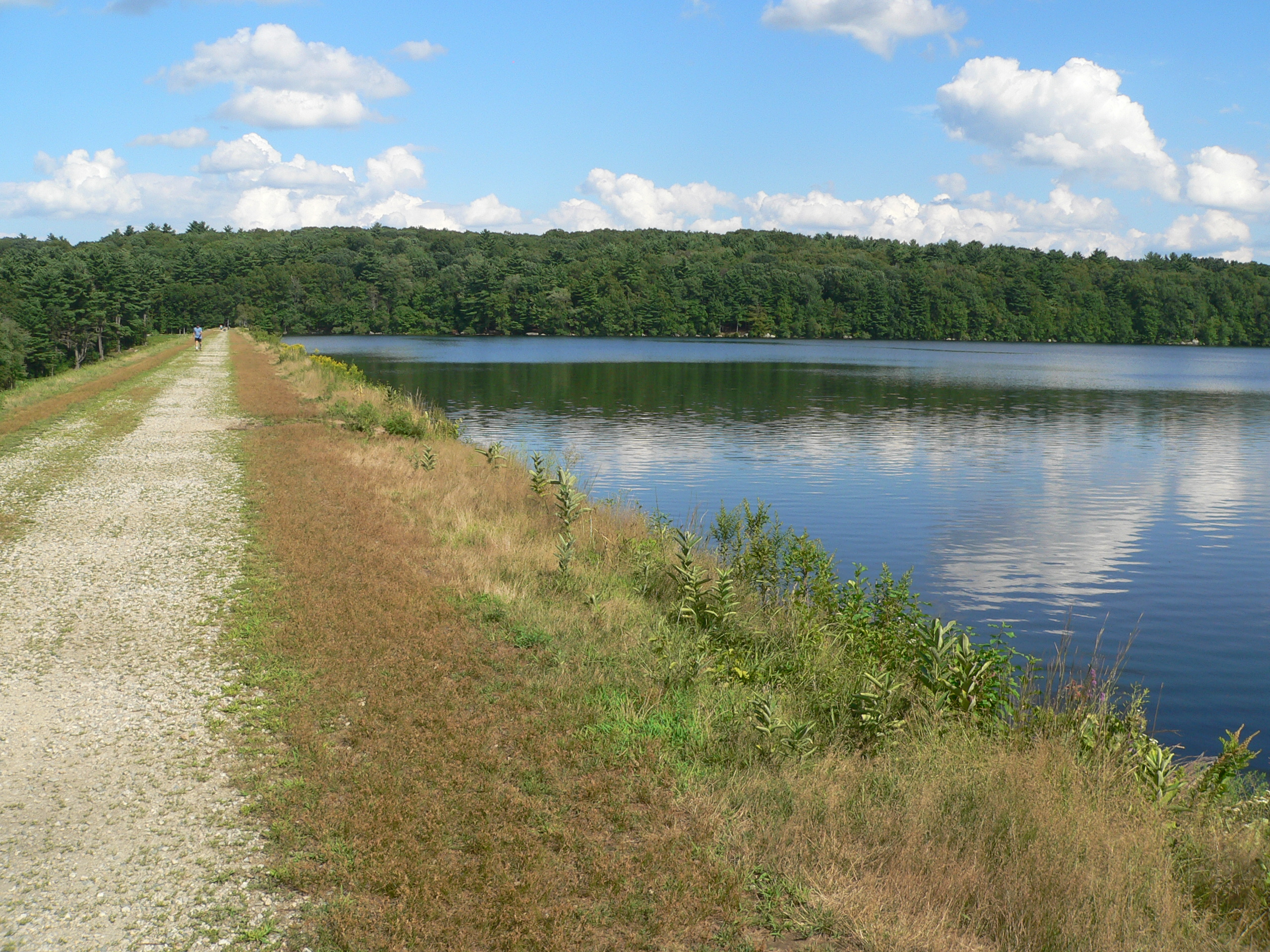
Dam and reservoir

The park was authorized when the Ashland Reservoir, which was completed in 1895, was taken out of service in 1947. In January 1954, $30,000 ($359,665 in 2025) was approved by the state's forests and parks agency for construction of a roadway, parking area, beach, and associated structures.

In August 1956, an 11-year-old youth drowned at the park while on a Boys Club outing from Boston. A 28-year-old man from Medfield, Massachusetts, drowned at the park in June 1967. Another drowning occurred in July 1968.

Efforts by state workers in October 1988 to temporarily lower the level of the reservoir in order to expand the beach resulted in a larger than expected release of water, causing basement flooding in two Ashland homes.

Elements of the reservoir were added to the National Register of Historic Places in 1990 as Ashland Dam and Spillway.

The park was unstaffed from 2009 through 2012 due to budget cuts and reopened in 2013 with funding to restore facilities that had deteriorated during the shutdown.

The film The Sea of Trees starring Matthew McConaughey was partially filmed in Ashland State Park in August 2014.

On August 24, 2016, an ultralight helicopter crashed into the Ashland Reservoir after experiencing engine trouble. No one was injured when the craft submerged in water up to 30 feet (9.1 m) deep some 200 to 300 yards (180 to 270 m) offshore.

== Activities and amenities ==
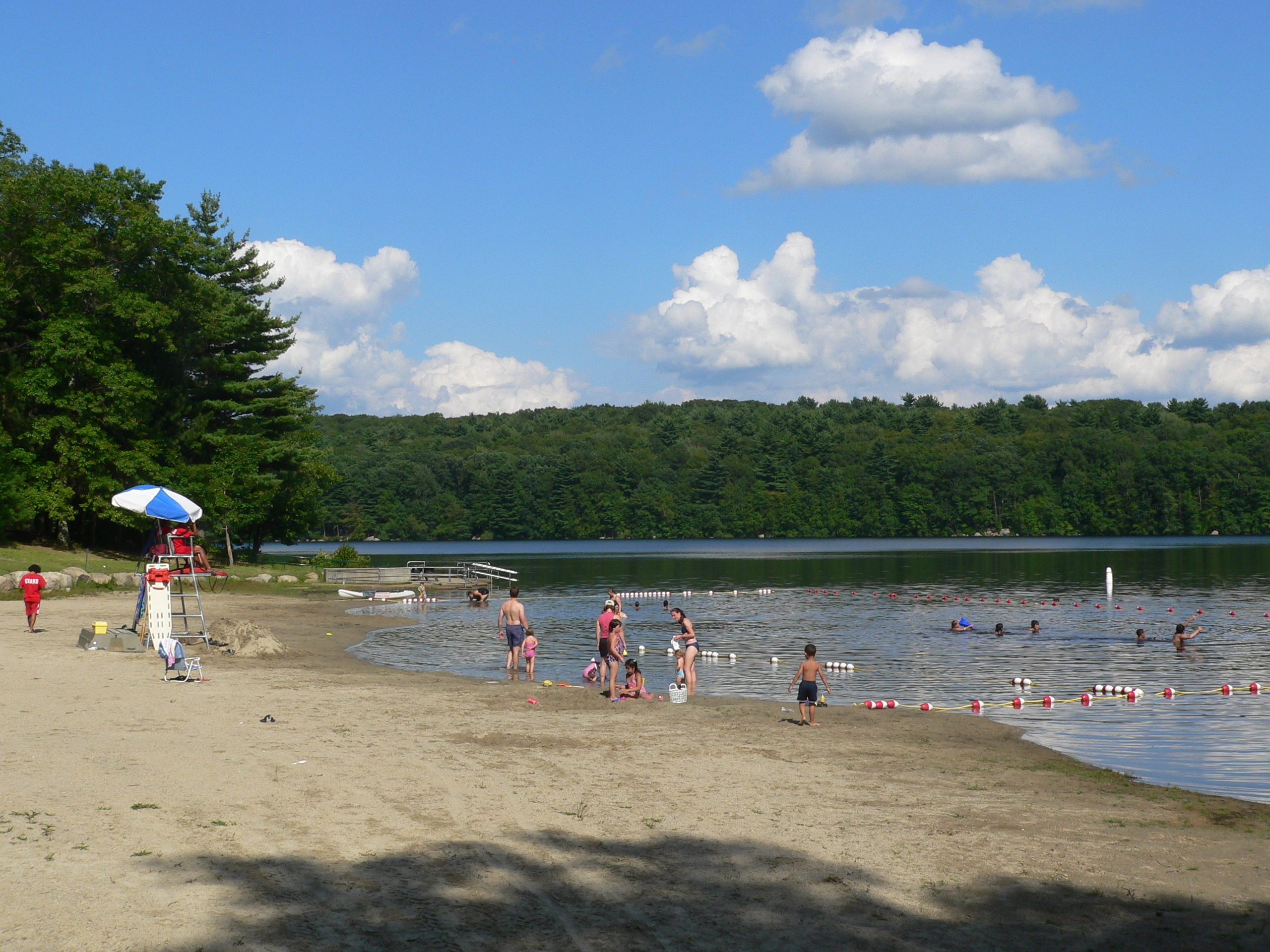
Swimming beach

The park's trails are used for hiking, bicycling, and cross-country skiing. The park has wheelchair-accessible restrooms, picnic grounds and swimming beach in addition to a ramp for motorized and non-motorized boating and fishing. It is staffed seasonally.
