= Ashland, Massachusetts =

- Town
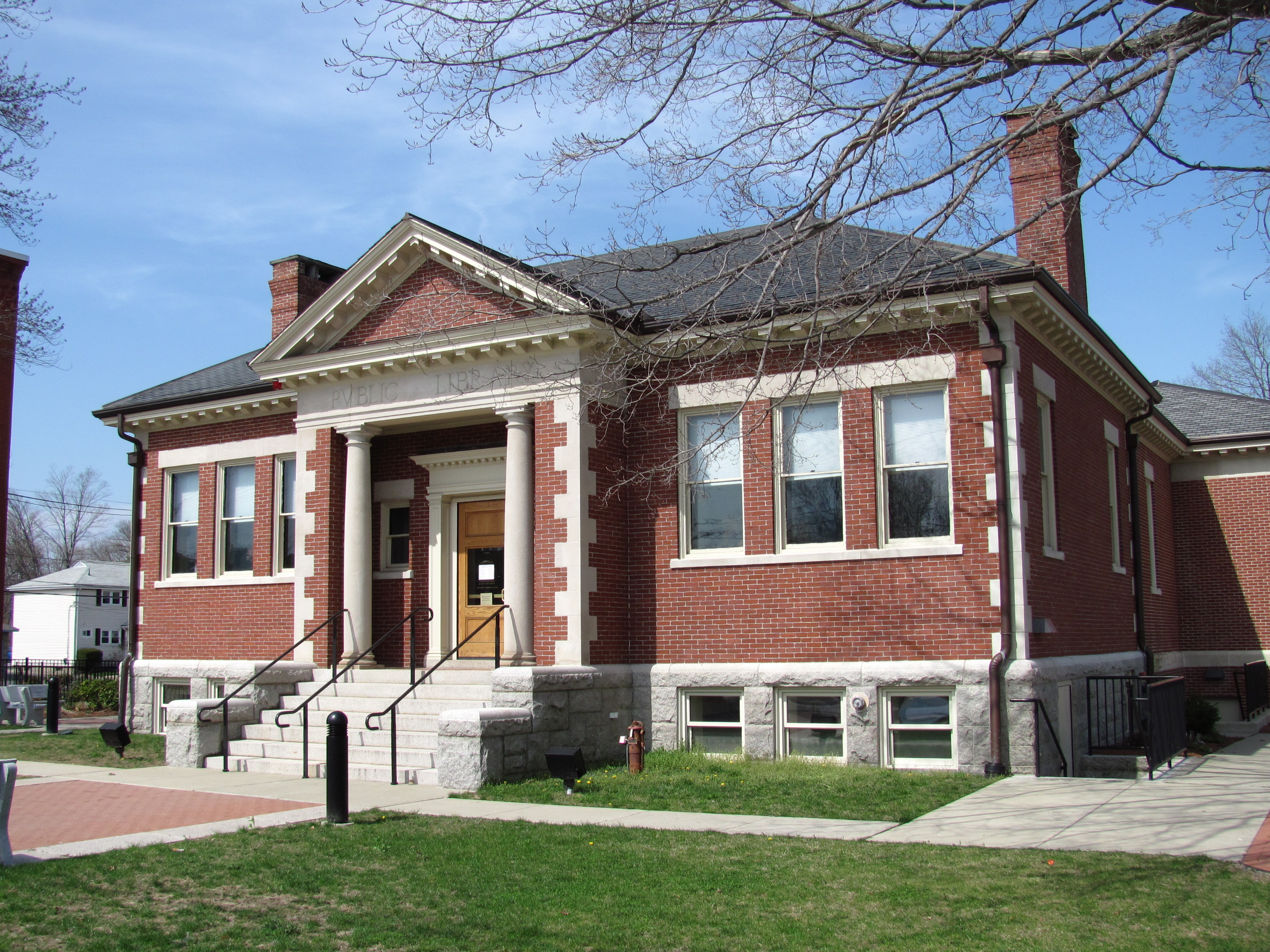
- Ashland Public Library (2010)

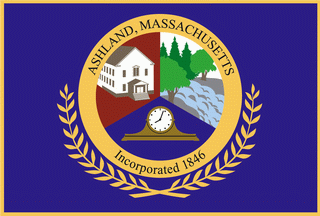
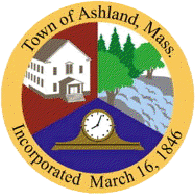
- Flag Seal
- Nicknames: Clock Town; The Home of the Electric Clock
- Location in Middlesex County in Massachusetts

- Location in Massachusetts Ashland (the United States) Ashland (North America)
- Coordinates: 42°15′40″N 71°27′50″W
- Country: United States
- State: Massachusetts
- County: Middlesex
- Settled: 1750
- Incorporated: 1846

Government
  - Type: Open town meeting
  - Town Manager: Michael Herbert

Area
  - Total: 12.9 sq mi (33.5 km^{2})
  - Land: 12.4 sq mi (32.2 km^{2})
  - Water: 0.46 sq mi (1.2 km^{2})
- Elevation: 187 ft (57 m)

Population (2020)
  - Total: 18,832
  - Density: 1,515/sq mi (584.8/km^{2})
- Time zone: UTC-5 (Eastern)
  - Summer (DST): UTC-4 (Eastern)
- ZIP code: 01721
- Area code: 508 / 774
- FIPS code: 25-02130
- GNIS feature ID: 0619394
- Website: www.ashlandmass.com

Ashland is a town in Middlesex County, Massachusetts, United States. It is part of the MetroWest region. The population was 18,832 at the 2020 United States census.

== History ==
=== 18th–19th centuries ===
The area now known as Ashland was settled in the early 18th century and inhabited prior to that by the Megunko Native Americans, to which Megunko Hill owes its name. Previously known as "Unionville", Ashland was incorporated in 1846, bearing the name of statesman Henry Clay's Kentucky estate. It is considerably younger than many of the surrounding towns, as Ashland's territory was taken in near-equal parts from the previously established towns of Hopkinton, Holliston (previously of colonial era Sherborn's territory), and Framingham.

The construction of the Boston & Worcester Railroad, later the Boston & Albany, in the 1830s was key to the early development of the town. Decades later, two other rail lines opened stations in Ashland. Along with the Sudbury River, the railroad helped to attract numerous mills to develop a bustling boot and shoe industry. However, by constructing three reservoirs along the river in 1878, the Boston Water Board inadvertently stymied further growth, most notably by halting the construction of the Dwight Printing Company's granite mills. Although the mills closed, starting in the 1890s the Hopkinton Railroad Company, providing a connection to Milford, and the Natick Street Railway, which operated streetcars between the towns of Sherborn, Framingham, and Natick, offered service in Ashland. These rail lines were gone by the 1920s, rendered obsolete by automobiles.

=== Telechron ===
Around the same time that the local rail lines were in decline, the inventor Henry E. Warren developed the Warren Synchronizing Timer in 1916, which made synchronous electric clocks possible by keeping alternating current flowing from power plants at a consistent sixty cycles per second. Warren founded Telechron, which, in partnership with General Electric. At its height in the 1950s, Telechron employed 2,000 people, or roughly one-third of Ashland. GE manufactured electric clocks in Ashland until 1979, when it sold to Timex. Thirteen years later, the Telechron plant was closed for good. A Warren Synchronizing Timer is on display at the Smithsonian's Museum of American History in Washington D.C., and the high school sports teams are called "The Clockers".

=== 20th century ===
For most of the 20th century, Ashland's population remained slow in growth, until the post-war boom beginning in the 1950s. During that period, Ashland grew from a far-removed rural town 22 miles (35 km) west of Boston to a primarily residential suburb by the 1980s. Over time, many farms and open spaces have given way to housing, although some untouched land still remains, including the Ashland Town Forest, Ashland State Park, Warren Woods, and land comprising the beach and dam portions of Hopkinton State Park.

Two members of the Ashland Police Department have died in the line of duty. Patrolman Louis Duncan Phipps died on June 10, 1942, four days after he was injured attempting to subdue an intoxicated man at a dinner dance. Patrolman Charles E. Cadorette died on September 11, 1967, from a gunshot wound suffered when he attempted to disarm a person who had stolen a car. Cadorette's partner, Robert Gonfrade, was also shot during the incident, but managed to return fire, resulting in the death of the man who had shot Cadorette. Gonfrade recovered from his injuries and later served as Ashland's chief of police from 1973 to 1994.

Four members of the Ashland Fire Department have died in the line of duty. On August 21, 1963, three members of the department—Chief Charles Moran, Lt. Norman E. Barry, and Firefighter John Rebenacker—were killed when a fuel tank exploded while they were providing mutual aid at a fire in neighboring Framingham. Firefighter Edward J. Bessey (Note: The department's website gives his surname as Bessy.) was killed on February 23, 1966, when his car was struck by a train as he was driving to the fire station to respond to a call.

Massachusetts Route 135 and Massachusetts Route 126 pass through Ashland. Route 135 is dominated by older residential development of varying density and is also part of the route for the Boston Marathon, which began in Ashland on Pleasant Street until the start was moved to Hopkinton's Main Street in 1924. Route 126 has developed rapidly since the 1980s, as farms have given way to shopping centers and condominiums. A part of the draw of Ashland, and one that has been publicized in recent years, is its "ideal" location about halfway between the cities of Boston and Worcester. The town has its own stop on the Framingham/Worcester Line of the MBTA Commuter Rail and also has nearby access to both I-90 and I-495. I-90 briefly passes through the northernmost part of Ashland, but there is no interchange there.

Ashland is considered part of MetroWest, which also includes the nearby towns of Framingham, Holliston, and Hopkinton. Hopkinton is Ashland's longstanding rival in a traditional Thanksgiving Day football game, a rivalry with roots in the formation of the town and the resulting 1846 dispute concerning Ashland's fire engine Megunko 1.

=== Nyanza ===
The US Color and Chemical Company, later named New England Aniline Works, Inc., and finally The Nyanza Color and Chemical Company, had a dye-manufacturing plant in Ashland. The plant opened in 1917 when American entry into World War I cut off the supply of dyes from Germany, then the world's principal source. In 1971, the factory was identified as a hazard when pollution was discovered in the nearby Sudbury River. The site was placed on the Superfund National Priority List in 1982 when heavy metals and organochlorides were discovered in the soil and water near the site. It was also deemed probable that particles of mercuric sulfate were blown into the air. In 1998, Trustees settled natural resource damages (NRD) claims with the responsible parties at the Nyanza Chemical Waste Dump Superfund Site for $3 million. $230,769 of the settlement was allocated for groundwater resources.

In 2006, the Massachusetts State Department of Public Health released a study that found that people who grew up in Ashland between the late 1960s and early 1980s and swam in the waters near Nyanza had a 200–300% higher incidence of cancer than those who were not exposed to the chemicals. In 2011, the Massachusetts Department of Environmental Protection's Bureau of Waste Site Cleanup's NRD program settled with the slowly-going-bankrupt Nyanza for $3 million, which with interest has grown to almost $4 million. The Nyanza case had previously been at the NRD program of the Massachusetts Executive Office of Energy and Environmental Affairs. In 2016, proposed housing near Nyanza site raised alarm in Ashland. In 2020, the EPA proposed a remedy to clean up groundwater near the site, the final operable unit (phase) of the site cleanup.

== Geography ==
According to the United States Census Bureau, the town has a total area of 12.9 square miles (33 km^{2}), of which 12.4 square miles (32 km^{2}) is land and 0.5 square miles (1.3 km^{2}) (3.72%) is water.

=== Adjacent towns ===
Ashland is located in eastern Massachusetts, bordered by:

- Framingham on the northeast
- Sherborn on the east
- Holliston on the south
- Hopkinton on the southwest
- Southborough on the northwest

=== Climate ===
Ashland's climate is typical for New England. Winters are variably cold, with frequent Nor'easters and occasional blizzards. Snowfall ranges widely from season to season, although the average is about 40–50 inches (100–130 cm). In the recent past, there has been as little as 14 inches (36 cm) of snow (in the 1988–89 winter season) to 148 inches (380 cm) (in 1995–1996). The amount decreases dramatically eastward towards Boston because of the influence of the Atlantic Ocean. Snowfall amounts can also decrease rapidly south of Ashland. Low temperatures below 0 °F (−18 °C) are not uncommon in winter, and the lowest recent temperatures have been −17 °F (−27 °C) during the 1994 North American cold wave, −14 °F (−26 °C) in January 2011, and −16 °F (−27 °C) in February 2016. Average January high temperatures are in the range 30 to 34 °F (−1 to 1 °C). Average January low temperatures are in the range 16 to 19 °F (−9 to −7 °C). Snow depth can reach 24 inches (61 cm) or more during the winter season. The winter of 2010–2011 was notable for snow depths of nearly 40 inches (100 cm) during January and February. Nearly 60 inches (150 cm) of snowfall was recorded in Ashland in January 2011 alone. The winter of 2014–2015 saw a very cold February and March. Snow cover lasted from late January until the first week of April. February 2015 was one of the coldest months on record. Snowfall for Ashland was 107.6 inches (273 cm) for the season, and snow depth reached 45 inches (110 cm).

Spring temperatures can be mitigated by penetrating cold fronts originating from the Canadian Maritimes, known as "backdoor cold fronts". Typically, high temperatures consistently above 70 °F (21 °C) do not set in until late May. The last frost is usually in mid-May. Summers are generally comfortable, with periods of high humidity. Prolonged heat waves of three or more days with highs of 90 °F (32 °C) or above are uncommon, but can occur. In July 2011, an unusually high temperature of 101 °F (38 °C) was reached. Average July high temperatures are in the range 80 to 84 °F (27 to 29 °C) and average lows are around 60 °F (16 °C).

Severe summer weather is not as common as in areas to the west in Central Massachusetts. However, on July 10, 1989, high winds occurred, causing widespread tree damage through most of Ashland with several homes damaged. This storm was part of a complex of severe storms that spawned several EF0 and EF1 tornadoes in towns in some neighboring counties. Fall is pleasant, with the first frost usually around October 1, and the peak of the fall foliage season averages around October 12. Ashland can expect a white Christmas slightly over 50 percent of the time.

== Demographics ==
Historical population
Year	Pop.	±%
1850	1,304	—
1860	1,554	+19.2%
1870	2,186	+40.7%
1880	2,394	+9.5%
1890	2,532	+5.8%
1900	1,525	−39.8%
1910	1,682	+10.3%
1920	2,287	+36.0%
1930	2,307	+0.9%
1940	2,479	+7.5%
1950	3,500	+41.2%
1960	7,779	+122.3%
1970	8,882	+14.2%
1980	9,165	+3.2%
1990	12,066	+31.7%
2000	14,674	+21.6%
2010	16,593	+13.1%
2020	18,832	+13.5%
2024*	19,391	+3.0%
* = population estimate. Source: United States census records and Population Estimates Program data.

At the 2010 census, there were 16,593 people, 6,385 households and 4,531 families residing in the town. The population density was 1,338.1 inhabitants per square mile (516.6/km^{2}). There were 6,609 housing units at an average density of 533.0 per square mile (205.8/km^{2}). The racial makeup of the town was 84.2% White, 2.4% African American, 0.1% Native American, 8.8% Asian, 2.6% from other races, and 1.9% from two or more races. Hispanic or Latino people of any race were 4.5% of the population.

There were 6,484 households, of which 36.7% had children under the age of 18 living with them, 59.0% were married couples living together, 2.7% had a male householder with no wife present, 8.5% had a female householder with no husband present, and 29.8% were non-families. 24.9% of all households were made up of individuals, and 9.1% had someone living alone who was 65 years of age or older. The average household size was 2.51 and the average family size was 3.04.

Of the 16,593 people in the population, 24.9% were under the age of 18, 5.5% were 15 to 19 years of age, 4.1% were 20 to 24 years of age, 27.9% were 25 to 44 years of age, 30.7% were 45 to 64 years of age, and 10.9% were 65 years and over. The median age was 40.1 years. For every 100 females, there was 94.6 males. For every 100 females 18 years and over there were 92.0 males.

The median household income was $93,770, and the median family income was $116,799. The median income of individuals working full-time was $79,485 for males versus $60,720 for females. The per capita income for the town was $46,626. About 2.2% of families and 4.0% of the population were below the poverty line, including 3.7% of those under age 18 and 9.6% of those age 65 or over.

== Education ==
In 2005, the town completed the new Ashland High School and revised the division of grades. These changes include the 6th grade being moved to join the 7th and 8th grades in the former high school to form what is now Ashland Middle School and moving the 3rd grade from the Henry E. Warren Elementary School into the Mindess Elementary School to join the 4th and 5th grades. The kindergarten, 1st and 2nd grades are in the Henry E. Warren Elementary School, and preschool is in the William Pittaway School. The graduating class of 2007 was the first class to complete a full year in the new high school.

In 2009, a new program at Ashland High School encouraged teachers to "bridge the gap between subjects like math and history to the art world and visually engage students with traditional subject matter." This allowed students to make a connection between the material they were learning in the classroom and the knowledge of the arts and culture.

== Points of interest ==
=== Ashland Farmers Market ===
This local farmers market has been operating on Saturdays, 9am–1pm, June through October, each year since 2012. Around two dozen vendors sell fresh fruit, vegetables, meat, fish, bread, desserts, local wines, and crafts along with ready-to-eat food and coffee. There is a rotating menu of live music and children's activities.

=== Ashland Day ===
Ashland Day is typically held on the third Saturday in September, each year. The festivities occur near the center of town at Stone Park from morning until late afternoon, and include a number of booths and various carnival-like rides. Many of the school system's athletic clubs and organizations use the day as an annual fundraising event, but it serves primarily as a day for residents to enjoy numerous activities and foods. Traditionally, there are fireworks atop the dam at Hopkinton State Park (the dam is in Ashland), but budget cuts have canceled several recent displays. Ashland Day has only been canceled once, due to inclement weather, in 2004. The 25th anniversary of the event was held in 2010. For the first time in several years, fireworks were launched from atop the dam at Hopkinton State Park.

=== Stone's Public House ===
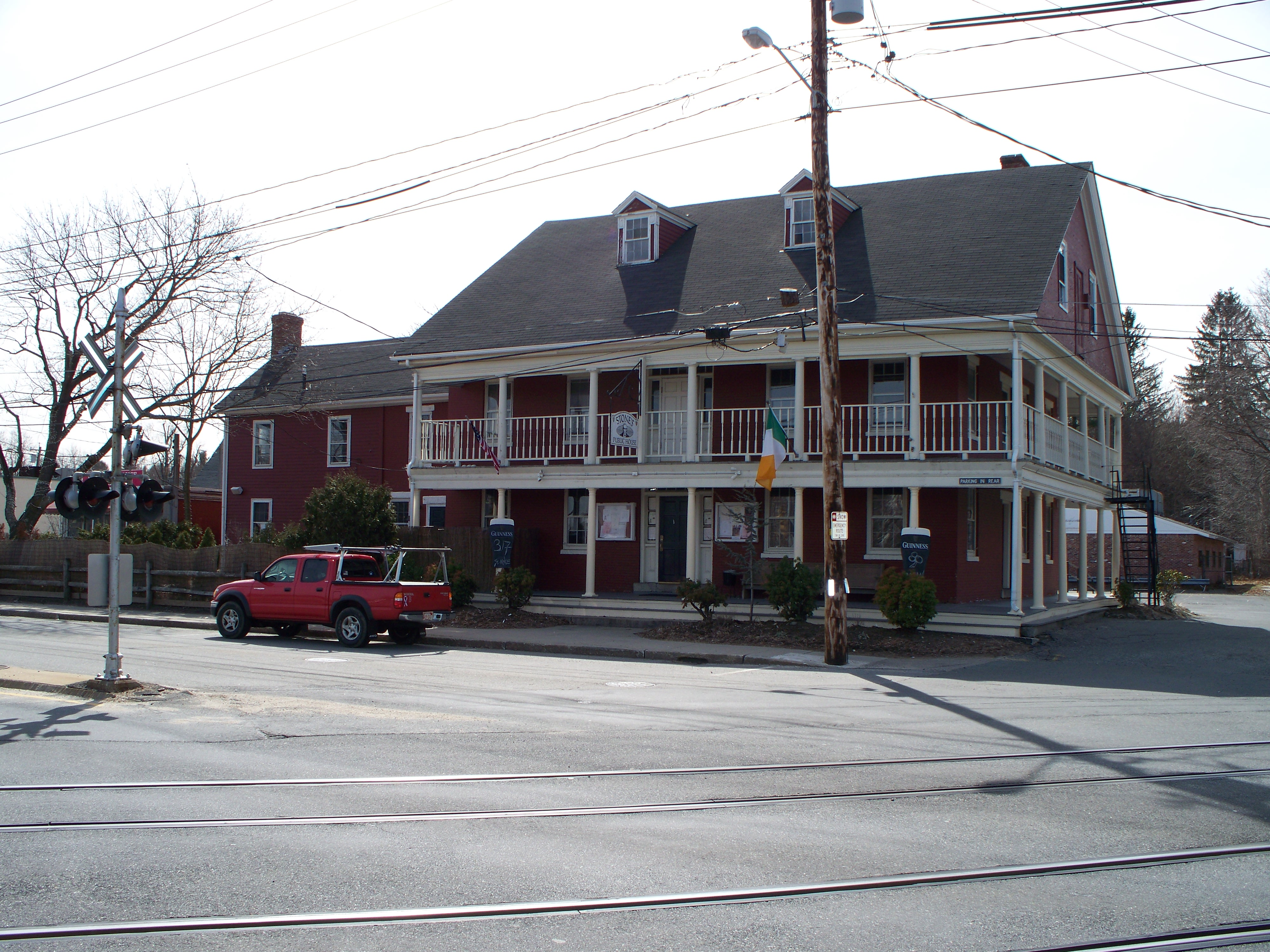
Stone's Public House, c. 2008

Built in 1832 by Captain John Stone to capitalize on the new Boston and Worcester Railroad, The Railroad House, later renamed John Stone's Inn, and now known as Stone's Public House, is located in the center of Ashland.

Stone's is reportedly the site of multiple hauntings. According to legend, the Inn was the site of a murder. Captain Stone is said to have killed a New York salesman named Mike McPherson accidentally after hitting him over the head with a pistol when he suspected McPherson of cheating at poker. It is said that Stone and three friends with whom he had been playing swore to keep the event secret and buried the salesman's body in the Inn's basement. The legend contends that the ghosts of the salesman and the three other players involved all roam the inn. No body has ever been found.

It is rumored that a ten-year-old girl, Mary J. Smith, was struck by a train while playing on the railroad tracks just outside the inn, on June 11, 1862. Onlookers rushed her inside the inn, where she would later succumb to her wounds. A number of employees, patrons, and passersby have reported seeing the apparition of a young girl in a dress, with most reports detailing her looking out various windows that overlook the rear of the building.

The inn was purchased from Herve Beaudoin in 1976 by Leonard "Cappy" Fournier and renovated. During renovations, a hidden chamber was discovered in the basement, and it is speculated that this was used to house runaway slaves who made their way to freedom in the North along the Underground Railroad.

One notable guest of the hotel, Daniel Webster, gave a speech from the balcony on the day the first train arrived in 1834. Joining him for the inaugural train were Governor John Davis and former Governor Levi Lincoln Jr.

=== Marathon history ===
Ashland was the original start line for the Boston Marathon from 1897 to 1923. As traditional marathon distances grew, the start line needed to be pushed back to Hopkinton in 1924. There is a small park on Pleasant Street in Ashland to remember this history, featuring a sign that reads "It all started here".

=== Open space ===
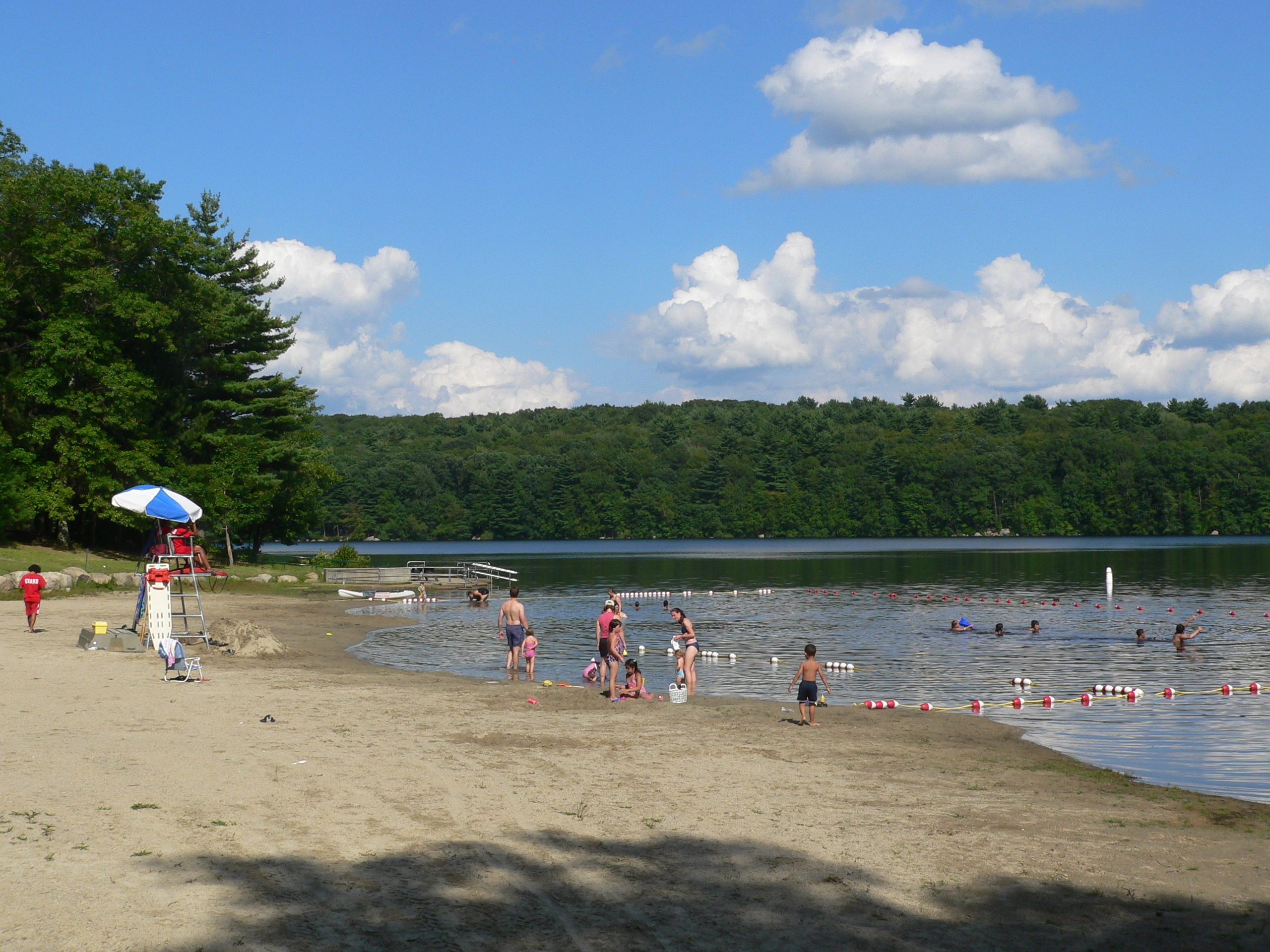
Beach at Ashland State Park

Ashland State Park, Ashland Town Forest, Hopkinton State Park, and Warren Woods are each partially or completely located within town lines. Both state parks include a lake with hiking, fishing, biking and swimming. Hopkinton State Park also has boat rentals and horseback riding trails.

Ashland State Park is 470 acres (190 ha) including a 157-acre (64 ha) reservoir. A 3 1/2-mile (5.6 km) hiking loop around it passes a boat launch, beach, dam and spillway. The latter two elements are listed on the National Register of Historic Places as Ashland Dam and Spillway.

Ashland Town Forest is 550 acres (220 ha) with hiking trails around rock outcroppings, small caves, and the rumored ending of some women who escaped the Salem witch trials. The town also owns over 100 acres (40 ha) of land, known as Warren Woods, on the south side of town with hiking trails across land once owned by inventor Henry E. Warren.

=== Sri Lakshmi Temple ===
Opened September 6, 1986, Sri Lakshmi Temple is a large regional Hindu temple located on Waverly Street and is the largest such temple in New England. Sri Lakshmi temple hosts several Hindu functions throughout the year. First housed in a Knights of Columbus Hall in Melrose in 1978 and later in the Needham Village Club, the congregation purchased about 12 acres (49,000 m^{2}) of land from Ashland in 1981.

== Transportation ==
Commuter rail service from Boston's South Station is provided by the MBTA with the Ashland station on its Framingham/Worcester Line. The station is accessible from either Pleasant Street or Memorial Drive (which runs behind Ashland Middle School).

== Notable people ==
- Dave Blass, film and television art director of Cold Case, ER, Justified, Biggest Loser, Beauty and the Geek
- Douglas R. Green, scientist at St. Jude Children's Research Hospital
- William McCarthy, baseball player for the 1906 Boston Beaneaters
- Lou Perini, principal owner of the Boston/Milwaukee Braves from 1945 to 1961
- Henry E. Warren, inventor of the first synchronous electric clock as well as numerous other inventions
