= Buck House =

Buck House may refer to:

== Locations ==
- Buck, a house of S. Thomas' College, Mount Lavinia, Sri Lanka
- Buck House Merton Bank, Douglas, Isle of Man, an Isle of Man Registered Building
- Buckingham Palace, royal residence in London, United Kingdom

=== United States ===
- Buck House (Los Angeles), California, a Los Angeles Historic-Cultural Monument
- Frank LaVerne Buck House, Pacific Grove, California
- Will H. Buck House, Vacaville, California
- Darnall's Chance, also known as Buck House, Upper Marlboro, Maryland
- Charles Buck House, Stoneham, Massachusetts
- Ephraim Buck House, Wilmington, Massachusetts
- Jesse H. Buck Farm House, Swartz Creek, Michigan
- Napoleon Buck House, Lafayette County, Missouri
- Jeremiah Buck House, Bridgeton, New Jersey
- Buck House NYC, a gallery in Manhattan, New York
- David M. Buck House, Yancey County, North Carolina
- Pearl S. Buck House, Bucks County, Pennsylvania
- A. W. Buck House, Ebensburg, Pennsylvania
- Buck's Upper Mill Farm, also known as the Henry Buck House, Bucksville, South Carolina,
- Lufkin Land-Long Bell-Buck House, Lufkin, Texas, listed on the NRHP

== See also ==
- Buckingham House (disambiguation)
