= Buckingham (disambiguation) =

Buckingham is a town in Buckinghamshire, England, United Kingdom.

Buckingham may also refer to:

== Geography ==
=== Australia ===
- Buckingham, Queensland, a locality in the Shire of Boulia, Queensland
- Buckingham, Western Australia, a locality in the Shire of Collie, Western Australia
- Buckingham Land District, Tasmania
- Electoral division of Buckingham

=== Canada ===
- Buckingham, Quebec
- Buckingham Island, Nunavut
- Buckingham House (fur trade post), Alberta

=== United Kingdom ===
- Borough of Buckingham
- Buckingham Hundred
- Buckingham (UK Parliament constituency)

=== United States ===
- Buckingham, Colorado
- Buckingham, Florida
- Buckingham, Illinois
- Buckingham, Iowa
- Buckingham Township, Bucks County, Pennsylvania
- Buckingham Township, Wayne County, Pennsylvania
- Buckingham, Texas
- Buckingham, Virginia
- Buckingham County, Virginia

== Education ==
- Buckingham School, an English school
- Buckingham School (Florida), a historic schoolhouse in the United States
- University of Buckingham, a private university in England

== Vehicles ==
- Buckingham (automobile), an English automobile
- HMS Buckingham, a list of ships of the Royal Navy called by that name
- USS Buckingham (APA-141), a WWII-era American naval ship

== Other uses ==
- Buckingham (surname)
- Buckingham (unit), a physical unit of quadrupole moment
- Bishop of Buckingham, suffragan bishop of the Church of England Diocese of Oxford
- Duke of Buckingham, a title of British peerage
- Earl of Buckingham, a title of British peerage
- Marquess of Buckingham, a title of British peerage
- Buckingham, a Beanie Baby bear sold exclusively in the United Kingdom
- Buckingham, a term used by the British Royal Flying Corps during World War I to denote incendiary ammunition

== See also ==
- The Buckingham (disambiguation)
