= Frank H. Buck Company =

Fruit growing and shipping company

For the U.S. Senator, see Frank H. Buck (Jr.).

The Frank H. Buck Company was a fruit growing and shipping company founded in 1886 by Frank H. Buck (father of the U.S. Senator Frank H. Buck (Jr.)). It was founded as Producer's Fruit Company but eventually renamed to Frank H. Buck Company.

== Founding ==
Leonard W. Buck and his family moved from Iowa to Vacaville, California in 1874 on the heels of harsh economic times and with very little capital. Buck purchased a farm of 166 acres bearing a small orchard and a few vines six miles north of Vacaville in the Vaca Valley. Buck made payments on the land by cultivating more than 120 acres and harvesting, packing and marketing the fruit that was produced from it. Leonard Buck's son, Frank H. Buck, owned 240 additional acres four miles from Vacaville, bearing 180 acres of fruit trees and vines, including peach, nectarines, apricots, figs and almonds.

In 1881, Leonard and Frank purchased 187 acres of land at US$100 per acre for cultivation of fruit trees and grape vines. In 1886, Frank purchased 55 acres of orchard and vineyards adjacent to the 187 acres for US$500 per acre. By 1887, the two had combined ownership of 372 acres.

In 1887, Leonard purchased an additional 400 acres of land near Lodi from B.F. Langford for US$40,000. Later that year, Frank Buck established Producer's Fruit Company, which would later be renamed to Frank H. Buck Company.

== Business ==
By 1893, the Frank H. Buck company was shipping 200 cars of fresh fruit per year (about 3 cars a day) with 110 workers.

=== Chinese Worker Deportation ===
Frank H. Buck was also a Trustee for the City of Vacaville, California. In 1893, a saloon owner, disgruntled by a recent saloon license fee increase passed by the Trustees, reported several illegal Chinese immigrants were working at the Frank H. Buck Company. The report was founded and ultimately resulted in the workers' deportation.

=== Expansion ===
When Frank H. Buck died in 1916, his son, Frank H. Buck (Jr.), succeeded him as president of the business. That same year, the company headquarters was moved to San Francisco. Over the years, the company saw several fires, including a fire that destroyed the Vacaville plant in 1930. A year later, the company's headquarters was moved from San Francisco back to Vacaville, where it was established, and the destroyed plant was rebuilt into a larger facility. In 1931, the company was said to hold 830 producing acres in San Joaquin, Solano, Yolo, Sacramento, Fresno and Sutter counties. About 1600 acres were held in other counties.

=== Wage Riots ===
In November 1932 following Frank H. Buck's election to the U.S. House of Representatives, workers at the company began to strike over wage disputes. Protesters, whom Buck claimed were out-of-town Communist ‘Reds,’ were disgruntled over alleged wage cuts at the company. The protest began as an opposition to “starvation wages” – the company had allegedly lowered pay from $1.50 to $1.25 a day and increased working hours from eight to nine. However, in an op-ed, Buck claimed wages had only decreased by 2 cents an hour due to winter slowdown and admitted wages were low but was the best fruit growers could do in the face of recent financial crisis. Buck contended the protests were directed at the regional industry rather than his own business and argued that further business disruption would not improve the growers’ payroll situation. However, the protests soon turned violent when members of the Agricultural Workers Industrial Union and police officers clashed, initially resulting in about a dozen people, including 2 police officers being injured in the melee. The fight began after a group of about 25 tree pruners drove to the entrance of the F. H. Buck Co. ranch, angering the approximately 200 strikers who deemed them “strike breakers.” The large crowd of strikers and the workers clashed after a worker was stabbed by a protester near the ranch entrance. Only about 14 police officers and some deputized citizens were on hand to handle the conflict. Two men were charged as primary agitators, Donald Bingham, a former UC Berkeley student and John Lopez, a laborer. Lopez was alleged to be responsible for the initial stabbing. Later that day, the pump house at the F. H. Buck Company was sabotaged as part of a plot to burn all buildings on the company's property, according to police. By week's end, 5 additional people had been arrested for their role in the riot. About a week later on December 5, unknown suspects entered the Vacaville Jail and kidnapped 5 of the protestors by using a key to the cells. They were found 15 miles away with shaved heads and covered in red paint. They were reportedly assaulted and told not to return to Vacaville. In a statement, Buck condemned the kidnapping and suggested most of the protesters were agitators from San Jose but admitted some were from San Francisco and Sacramento. About a month later, a report by the Sacramento Valley Federated Trades Council found the Agricultural Workers Industrial Union membership began employment at neighboring ranches (including one owned by the Vacaville mayor's family) only two weeks before the strike. It was found that the group, none of whom were employed by Buck's company, were out-of-towners who “preyed upon the susceptibility of the younger and less responsible of the Spanish [workers] who extravagant promises of outside support and martyrdom.” The report went on to explain the AWIU arranged the strike to capitalize on public attention surrounding Frank Buck's recent election victory.

== Retirement ==
After Frank H. Buck's successful election to represent California's third district, it was announced that Frank H. Buck company would discontinue the sales and shipping portion of the business. The Pacific Fruit exchange would handle all shipping of fruit produced on the orchards. In 1940, packing and shipping operations merged with the Vacaville Fruit Company. Following the death of Frank H. Buck (Jr.) in 1942, the company land was sold by his estate, part of which later became the location of California Medical Facility.
