= Will H. Buck House =

Historic house in California, United States

- U.S. National Register of Historic Places
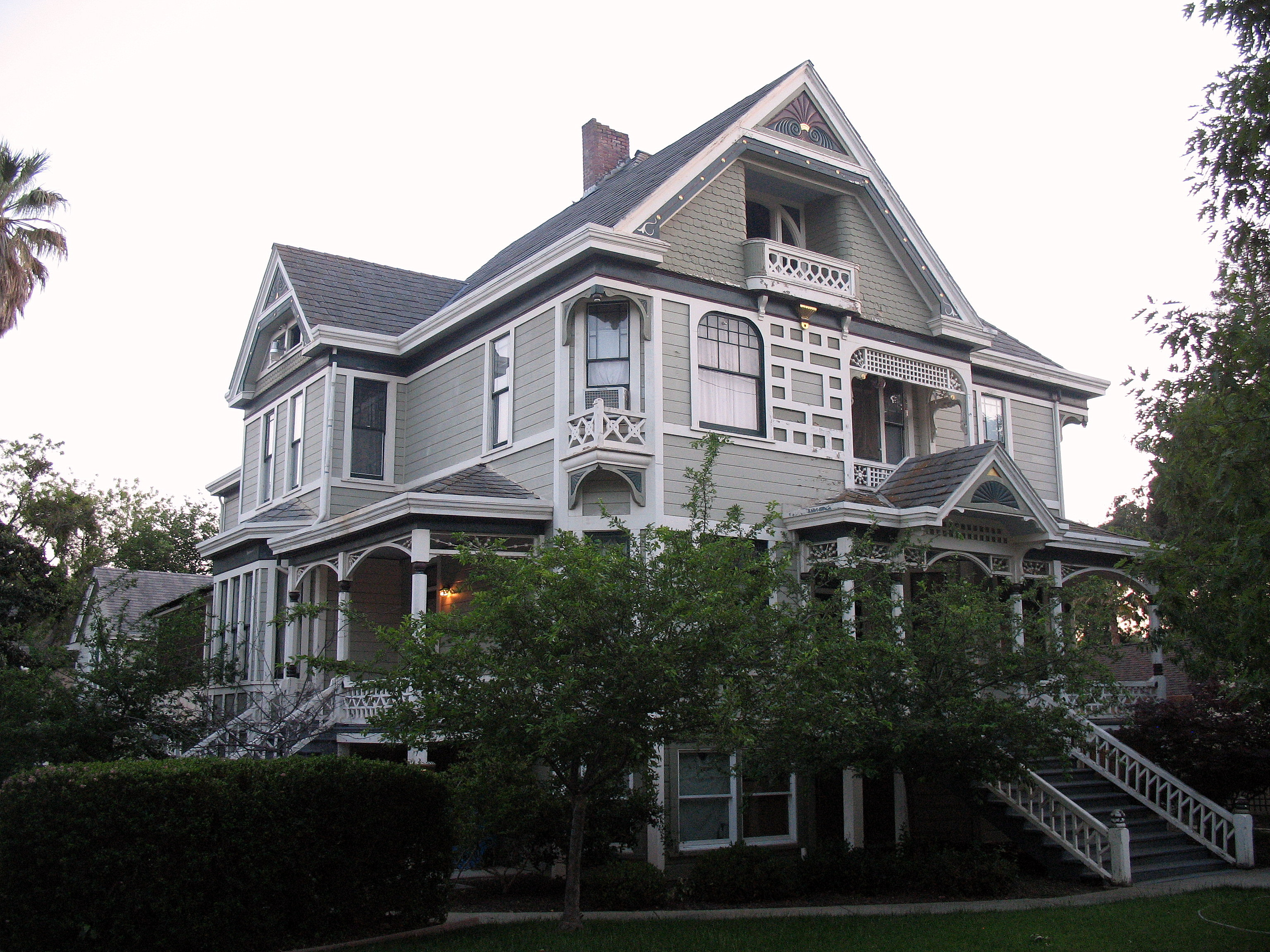

- Location within California Location within the United States
- Location: 301 Buck Ave., Vacaville, California
- Coordinates: 38°21′24″N 121°59′38″W
- Area: 0.5 acres (0.20 ha)
- Built: 1892
- Architect: George Sharpe
- Architectural style: Queen Anne
- NRHP reference No.: 85003372
- Added to NRHP: October 24, 1985

The Will H. Buck House is a historic building in Vacaville, California, United States. Designed by George Sharpe, it was built in 1892 in the Queen Anne style and was placed on the U.S. National Register of Historic Places on October 24, 1985.

== History ==
The house was built in 1892 by George Sharpe, a local master builder, for William H. Buck, a relative of the fruit grower Leonard W. Buck who was born in New York State in 1846 and moved to California in 1881. Leonard Buck's son Frank H. Buck Sr., whose son Frank Jr. became a United States congressman, built a house nearby at the same time. The house changed ownership in the mid-1930s and was divided into apartments. It was renovated in 2003.

== House ==
The house is located in a section of Vacaville that the Buck family bought in 1887 as a tract of 147.6 acres (59.7 ha), and was later built up with other large houses along Buck Avenue, which continues Main Street. It is two and a half stories with an attic and is built in Queen Anne style, of redwood timber and with redwood siding; the interior woodwork is of oak in Eastlake style. There are three balconets, on the second floor, the attic level, and at a hooded window on one of two cutaway corners, and decorative carving on the facades includes spandrels and coves decorated with geometric designs, checkerboard patterning, and Eastlake spindle and spool carving. The house is also decorated with stained glass, particularly on the main staircase, and the transom above the front door has opalescent stained glass surrounding smoked glass with "W.H. Buck" etched into it. A carriage house to the rear was adapted in the mid-1930s into a two-storey apartment building.
