= Buckingham House =

Buckingham House can refer to:

== United States ==
- Buckingham House (Milford, Connecticut), listed on the NRHP in New Haven County, Connecticut
- William A. Buckingham House, Norwich, Connecticut
- John Buckingham House, Newton, Massachusetts
- Buckingham-Petty House, Duncan Falls, Ohio, listed on the NRHP in Muskingum County, Ohio
- Sherwood-Davidson and Buckingham Houses, Newark, Ohio, listed on the NRHP in Licking County, Ohio
- Buckingham House (Sevierville, Tennessee)

== Other places ==
- Buckingham House, Kirkbymoorside, in North Yorkshire, England
- Buckingham Palace, originally known as Buckingham House, London, England
- Buckingham House (fur-trade post), on the North Saskatchewan River, Alberta, Canada

== See also ==
- The Buckingham (disambiguation)
- Buck House (disambiguation)
