= Senator Buck (disambiguation) =

C. Douglass Buck (1890–1965) was a U.S. Senator from Delaware 1943 to 1949. Senator Buck may also refer to:

- Carrie Buck (politician) (born 1971), Nevada State Senate
- Clarence F. Buck (1870–1944), Illinois State Senate
- Daniel Buck (judge) (1829–1905), Minnesota State Senate
- George L. Buck (1866–1939), Wisconsin State Senate
- Jim Buck (Indiana politician) (born 1945), Indiana State Senate
- Leonard W. Buck (1834–1895), California State Senate
