= Charles F. Curry Jr. =

American politician

Charles Forrest Curry Jr.
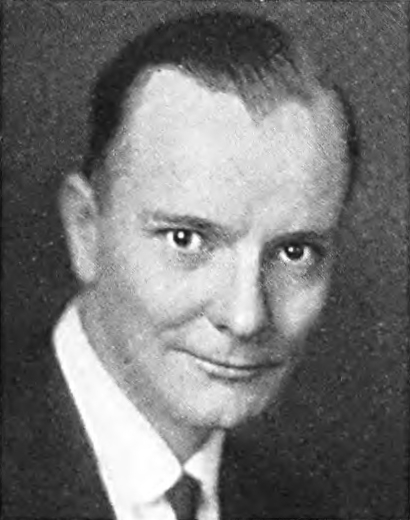
- Official portrait, c. 1932

Member of the U.S. House of Representatives from California's 3rd district
- In office March 4, 1931 – March 3, 1933
- Preceded by: Charles Forrest Curry
- Succeeded by: Frank H. Buck

Personal details
- Born: Charles Forrest Curry, Jr. August 13, 1893 San Francisco, San Francisco County, California, USA
- Died: October 7, 1972 (aged 79) Long Beach, California, U.S.
- Resting place: Westminster Memorial Park, Westminster, California
- Party: Republican
- Parent: Charles Forrest Curry (father)
- Education: George Washington University; Georgetown University

Military service
- Allegiance: United States
- Branch/service: United States Army
- Years of service: 1917–1919
- Unit: Aviation Section, Signal Enlisted Reserve Corps
- Battles/wars: World War I

Charles Forrest Curry Jr. (August 13, 1893 – October 7, 1972) was an American lawyer and World War I veteran who served one term as a U.S. representative from California from 1931 to 1933.

He was the son of Charles Forrest Curry.

== Early life and education ==
Born in San Francisco, California, Curry attended the public schools Howe's Academy in Sacramento, California as well as George Washington University and Georgetown University School of Law, Washington, D.C.

== World War I ==
During the First World War, Curry Jr. enlisted in the Aviation Section, Signal Enlisted Reserve Corps, on August 15, 1917. There, he was commissioned a second lieutenant and served until May 22, 1919, with overseas service.

== Career ==
He served as secretary to his father, Congressman Charles F. Curry from 1913 to 1917, then later as a clerk to the Committee on the Territories of House of Representatives from 1919 to 1930. In 1921, he was admitted to the bar.

=== Congress ===
Curry was elected as a Republican as a write-in candidate to the Seventy-second Congress (March 4, 1931 – March 3, 1933) following the death of his father, who was on the ballot. He was an unsuccessful candidate for reelection in 1932 to the Seventy-third Congress.

=== Later career ===
After leaving Congress, Curry engaged in the practice of law and in mining and other business enterprises.

== Retirement and death ==
He resided in Long Beach, California, where he died on October 7, 1972.

He was interred in Westminster Memorial Park, Westminster, California.

== Electoral history ==
United States House of Representatives elections
Party	Candidate	Votes	%
Republican	Charles F. Curry Jr.	43,336	53.4
Republican	J. M. Inman	26,785	33.0
Democratic	Frank H. Buck	9,172	11.3
Independent	Katherine Braddock	1,753	2.2
Independent	E. M. Turner	49	0.1
Total votes		80,095	100.0
Republican hold			

United States House of Representatives elections
Party	Candidate	Votes	%
Democratic	Frank H. Buck	61,694	56.8
Republican	Charles F. Curry (Incumbent)	46,887	43.2
Total votes		108,581	100.0
Democratic gain from Republican			

U.S. House of Representatives
Preceded by Charles F. Curry	Member of the U.S. House of Representatives from California's 3rd congressional district 1931–1933	Succeeded by Frank H. Buck
