= Gowing–Sheldon Historic District =

Historic district in Massachusetts, United States

- U.S. National Register of Historic Places
- U.S. Historic district
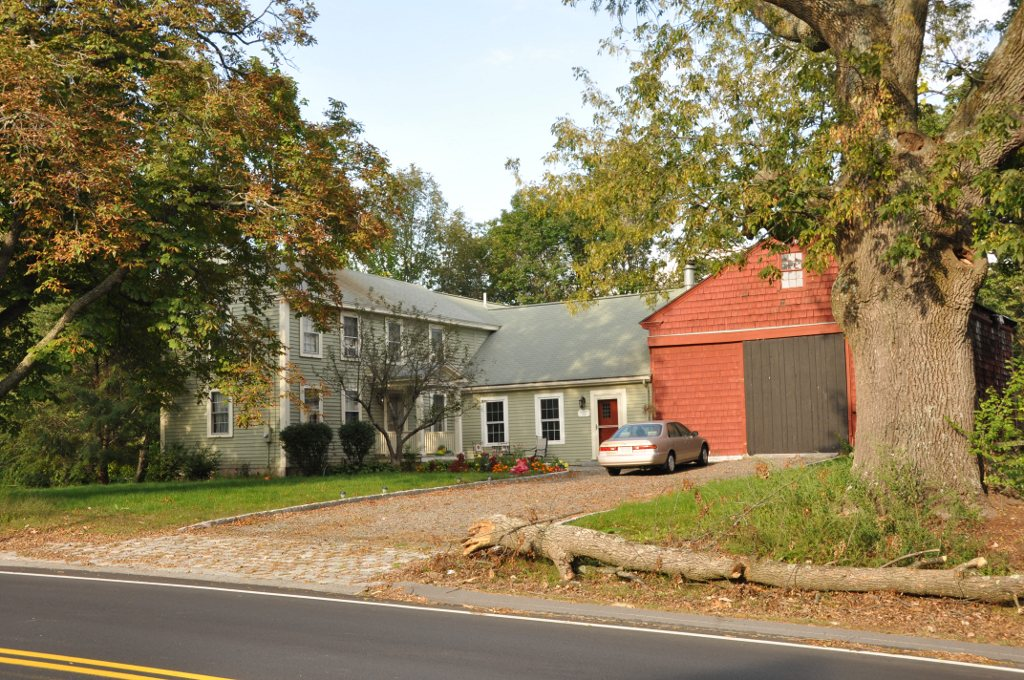
- 642 Woburn Street

- Location within Massachusetts Location within the United States
- Location: Wilmington, Massachusetts
- Coordinates: 42°32′30″N 71°9′1″W
- Area: 1.22 acres (0.49 ha)
- Architectural style: Federal, Queen Anne
- NRHP reference No.: 03001176
- Added to NRHP: November 21, 2003

The Gowing–Sheldon Historic District is a historic district containing two formerly rural properties, at 642 and 643 Woburn Street in Wilmington, Massachusetts. The district's houses are reminders of a period when the area was rural farmland along one of the oldest roads in town. The district was listed on the National Register of Historic Places in 2003.

== Gowing–Sheldon House ==
The Gowing–Sheldon House at 642 Woburn Street is a Federal style wood frame house built c. 1809. Like many period houses, it faces south and rests on a granite foundation; however, it is only four bays wide and one bay deep. There is a rear ell perpendicular to the main house that was added sometime before the turn of the 20th century, and has been modified since, based on photographic evidence. This ell connects the house to a 19th-century barn.

This house was built by Joel Tweed, a cordwainer who bought the property in 1809 and sold it, with house, in 1819. It was acquired in 1920 by John Gowing, who is reported in local histories to have raised a large family there. He sold the property in 1864 to Horace Sheldon, whose family owned the property until 1898.

== Lucy and Henry Sheldon House ==
In 1892, Lucy Sheldon purchased land across the street from the Sheldon house from her father-in-law, Henry, who was Horace's brother. The house that Lucy and Henry, Jr. had constructed in 1893 is one of the most elaborate Queen Anne houses in Wilmington. The house has cross gables expanding the third floor, its gables decorated with cut shingles and heavy brackets. A single story porch is decorated with turned posts and jigsaw brackets. The entry is highlighted by a gable end decorated with a starburst. In the back of the property is a carriage house, which carries on the Queen Anne styling.

== See also ==
- Buck's Corner Historic District, a little further north along Woburn Street
- National Register of Historic Places listings in Middlesex County, Massachusetts
