= Buck's Corner Historic District =

Historic district in Massachusetts, United States

- U.S. National Register of Historic Places
- U.S. Historic district
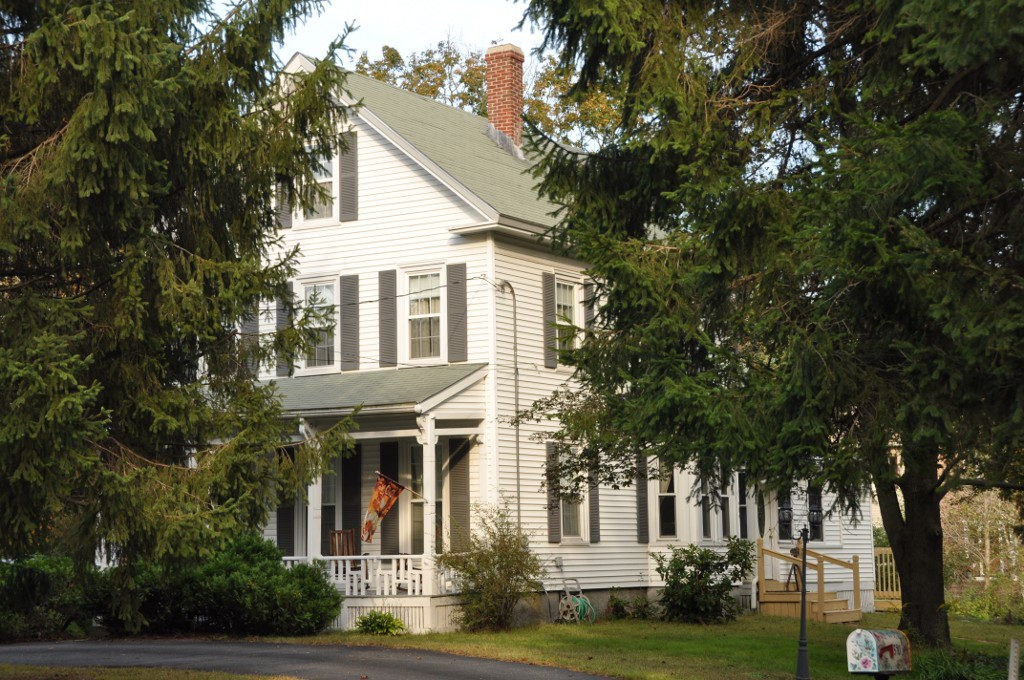
- 590 Woburn Street

- Location within Massachusetts Location within the United States
- Location: Wilmington, Massachusetts
- Coordinates: 42°32′52″N 71°9′5″W
- Area: 9.88 acres (4.00 ha)
- Architectural style: Federal, Italianate
- MPS: First Period Buildings of Eastern Massachusetts TR
- NRHP reference No.: 03001209
- Added to NRHP: November 21, 2003

Buck's Corner Historic District encompasses a cluster of formerly rural (now suburban) properties in eastern Wilmington, Massachusetts. The district covers 9.88 acres (4.00 ha), and includes six houses and three barns whose construction dates range from the late 17th to the late 19th centuries. Many of them have some association with the descendants of Roger Buck, who with his son Ephraim is said to have built the Ephraim Buck House (216 Wildwood Street) around the turn of the 18th century. Other houses in the district range along Woburn Street, south from Wildwood Street to Allenhurst Way. The district was listed on the National Register of Historic Places in 2003.

The oldest portion of the Ephraim Buck House is believed to have been built c. 1704, with a second section added in the 1740s. Its exterior was restyled c. 1770 to give it Federal period styling, including a front door entry with 3/4 length sidelight windows and an entablature. The Daniel Eames House at 584 Woburn Street may also have been built by Ephraim Buck, c. 1714–1723, and is a fairly typical early Georgian house. A third 18th century house, that at 604 Woburn Street, was originally believed to be 17th century in origin, but is more likely a Federal period construction from c. 1785-91.

The Jonathan Buck House (571 Woburn Street, c. 1795–1820) is an excellent local example of Federal architecture, and one of only a few period hip roofed houses in the town. It is the typical five bays wide and two deep, with a central doorway flanked by full-length sidelight windows and pilasters supporting a narrow entablature. The remaining contributing houses to the district were built later in the 19th century: the Henry Sheldon House (603 Woburn Street, c. 1861-62) is Italianate in style, and the John Howard Eames House (590 Woburn Street, c. 1883) is a Queen Anne Victorian. Three houses have 19th-century barns that contribute to the district (as did the Ephraim Buck House until its barn was demolished).

Two houses within the district bounds do not contribute to its significance. One is a modern house (c. 1999) at 588 Woburn Street; the other, at 580 Woburn Street, was an Italianate house built c. 1856–1875, but has been renovated in an historically insensitive manner. A Buck family house at 585 Woburn Street, dating to the late 18th century, was demolished not long before the district boundaries were drawn.

== See also ==
- National Register of Historic Places listings in Middlesex County, Massachusetts
- Gowing-Sheldon Historic District, a pair of historic houses further south on Woburn Street
