= Buck Scholarship =

California college scholarship from 1989 to 2016

Frank H. Buck Scholarships
- Description: Academic scholarship program providing full cost-of-attendance support for California college students
- Location: Vacaville, California
- Country: United States
- Presented by: Frank H. and Eva B. Buck Foundation
- Website: http://www.buckfoundation.org

The Frank H. Buck Scholarships were scholarships awarded annually by the Frank H. and Eva B. Buck Foundation to twelve to fifteen California students to assist with the costs of college. They were intended to supplement any other financial aid awarded to the recipient so that all the ordinary costs of an education were covered. The foundation, which existed from 1989 to 2016, also provided grant support to educational institutions, libraries, and other nonprofit organizations in support of education.

== History and administration ==
Eva Buck, wife of former United States congressman Frank H. Buck, started the foundation as the Solano Foundation in 1989 and chose the first two scholarship recipients. After her death the following year, it was renamed to honor her and her husband, and its headquarters moved to the 1891 Frank H. Buck house in Vacaville, California, the congressman's childhood home. The foundation's mission was to support education in all of its aspects.

== Eligibility and scope ==
The scholarships were awarded to approximately twelve to fifteen students a year chosen from the six counties included in the congressional district represented by Buck in the 72nd through 76th United States Congresses (1932-1942): Contra Costa, Napa, Sacramento, San Joaquin, Solano, and Yolo. As of 2008, the Buck Foundation was providing scholarship support to more than 259 students attending colleges and universities throughout the United States, as well as in other countries.

The foundation ceased operations in 2016. Buck Scholar alumni founded the Buck Scholars Association in 2008, a nonprofit that has run the Buck Fellows Program for Northern California high school students since 2014.

== Notable Buck Scholars ==
- Yul Kwon- Winner of Survivor: Cook Islands (1993)
