= Frank LaVerne Buck House =

Historic house in California, United States

- U.S. National Register of Historic Places
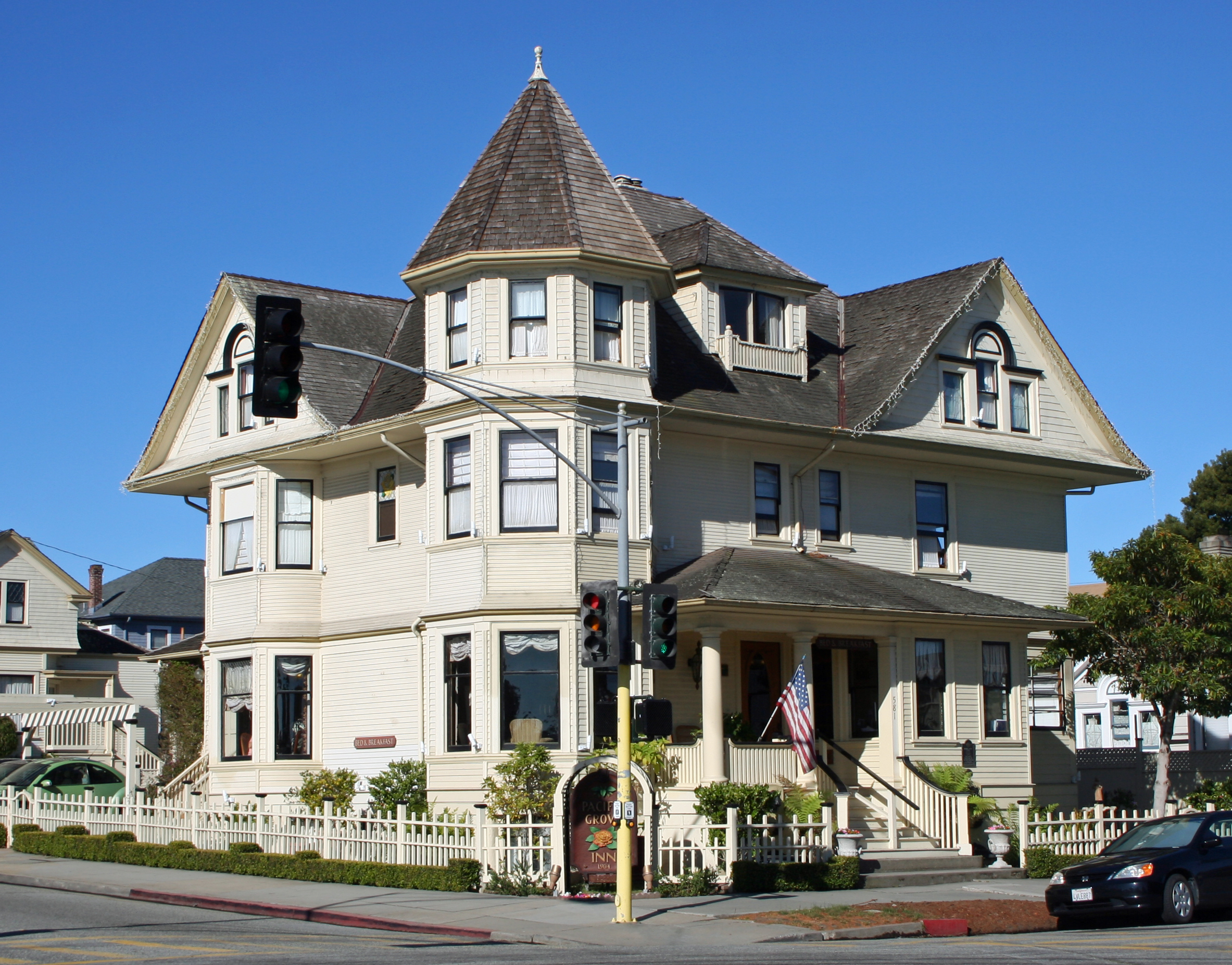
- House in 2010

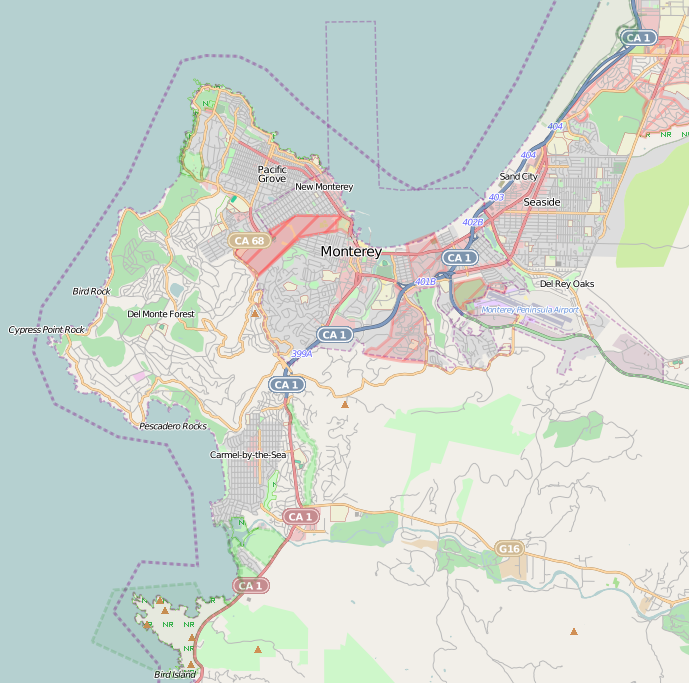
- Location within Monterey Peninsula Location within California Location within the United States
- Location: 581 Pine Ave., Pacific Grove, California
- Coordinates: 36°37′8″N 121°55′4″W
- Area: 0.1 acres (0.040 ha)
- Built: 1904
- Built by: Hovey, C.E.
- Architect: Gass, Robert C.
- Architectural style: Queen Anne
- NRHP reference No.: 86002401
- Added to NRHP: September 11, 1986

The Frank LaVerne Buck House, located at 581 Pine Ave. in Pacific Grove, California, is a historic house that is listed on the National Register of Historic Places. Also known as the Pacific Grove Inn, it was built in 1904.

It was the home of city civic leader Frank LaVerne Buck (1849-1931), a native Midwesterner who was involved in the dairy and egg businesses. The home is historically important as the only known surviving example of the work of local architect Robert C. Gass, and is one of only a few well-preserved Victorian houses in Pacific Grove. The front staircase and other woodwork in the house was completed by carpenter C.E. Hovey, who is known for craftsmanship in the area. Among its prominent exterior components is the fenestration, which features leaded glass and Palladian windows.

Built at the junction of Pine and Forest avenues, the house is a prominent component of its neighborhood's built environment. As a large building constructed in a combination of the Colonial Revival and the late Queen Anne styles, it dominates both cross streets.

It was listed on the National Register of Historic Places in 1986. In 2020, the building was a bed and breakfast with 16 rooms.
