= The Buckingham =

The Buckingham may refer to:

- The Buckingham (Chicago, Illinois), a condominium building
- The Buckingham (Indianapolis, Indiana), listed on the U.S. National Register of Historic Places

== See also ==
- Buckingham House (disambiguation)
