= Jesse H. Buck Farm House =

- U.S. National Register of Historic Places
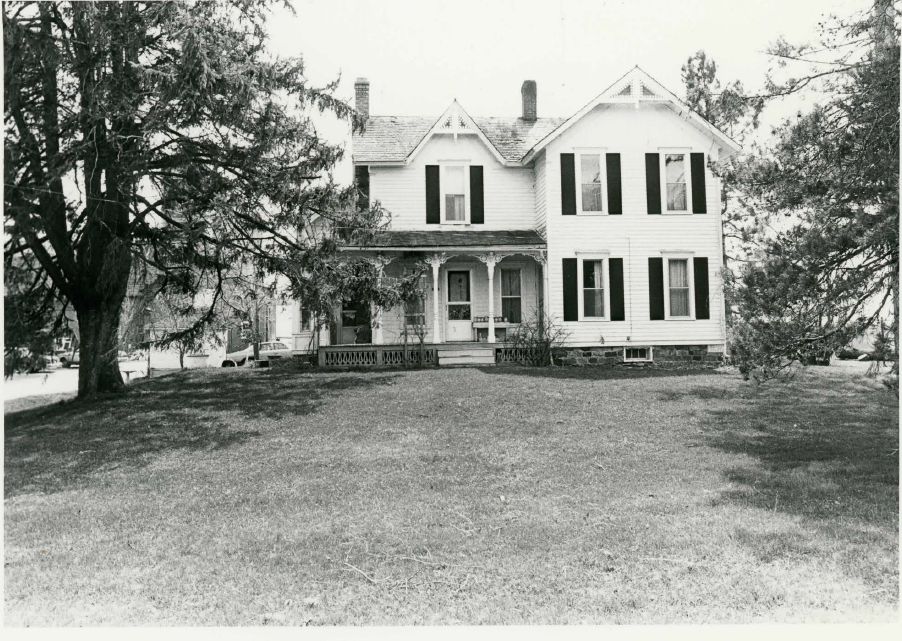

- Location within Michigan Location within the United States
- Interactive map
- Location: 6095 Baldwin Rd., Swartz Creek, Michigan
- Coordinates: 42°53′02″N 83°47′33″W
- Area: less than one acre
- Built: 1888
- Built by: Jesse H. Buck
- Architectural style: Gothic Revival
- MPS: Genesee County MRA
- NRHP reference No.: 82000503
- Added to NRHP: November 26, 1982

The Jesse H. Buck Farm House is a single-family home located at 6095 Baldwin Road in Swartz Creek, Michigan. It was listed on the National Register of Historic Places in 1982.

== History ==
Jesse H. Buck moved from Oakland County to this area in 1864. He purchased 80 acres of farmland and began raising livestock. He built this farmhouse in 1888.

== Description ==
The Buck Farm House is a two-story vernacular Gothic Revival frame structure built in a T-shaped plan. It has an open front porch with turned columns and elaborate bargeboards. The gable ends have similarly decorative bargeboards, along with vertical siding contrasting with the horizontal clapboard covering the remaining wall surfaces. A corner stone bears the inscription, 'J. S. Buck 1888'.
