= Buck House NYC =

Former art gallery in New York City

Coordinates: 40.784981°N 73.955988°W

Buck House was a gallery on Madison Avenue in the Carnegie Hill neighborhood of Manhattan's Upper East Side. The gallery opened in November 2001 and was owned and operated by artist Deborah Buck.

== History ==
The gallery displayed and sold art and design objects." In 2006, Buck House launched a second space nearby, called The Gallery at Buck House. This exhibition space hosted fine art exhibitions, book release parties, and events to benefit charitable organizations. In September 2009, Buck House closed its two locations in favor of a larger space on Madison Avenue, which combined both The Gallery at Buck House and Buck House under one roof. In a 2010 interview, Buck claimed that "the idea was to create a meeting place and a salon like those in 1920s Paris." In September 2012 Buck House closed its gallery, but continued on the internet.

== Buck House Gallery exhibitions ==
- Manhattan/Glamour, 2006, an exhibition of photographs, sculpture, paintings, and drawings, curated by Charlie Scheips.
- Gem, March 2007, an exhibition of treasures from the archive of the Illustration House. Curated by Charlie Scheips.
- Wild Flowers, September 2007 an exhibition that explores the visual power of the flower in paintings, furniture and decorative art. Curated by Deborah Buck.
- Roger Jazilek – An Exhibition of Paintings, September 2008. Curated by Deborah Buck.
- The Design Entrepreneur Book Launch Party, November 2008. The projects in The Design Entrepreneur reveal the ways that designers put their ideas into marketable forms.
- Autumn Hues, Lavenders & Blues, October 2009. Wearable Art/Janis Provisor applies her personal style to jewels.
- Elle Decor Celebrates the New Buck House, November 2009. Margaret Russell, editor-in-chief of Elle Decor, hosted the opening of Buck House at its new location at 1318 Madison Avenue and 93rd Street.
- Juan Montoya – Book Launch Party, December 2009
- Launch of Rocknrola Jewelry in NYC, February 2010. From Susan Cohn Rockefeller and Carola Mack, Rocknrola designs. Oceana benefit party.
- Indian Summer – Benefit Party, May 2010. A philanthropic endeavor for Buck House, profits went to Aid to Artisans, a nonprofit organization which champions the handmade arts and their artisans throughout the world.
- Garden Party, July 2010. Garden Party celebrates Buck House's first guest designer for the Buck House Window Project with the window installation, "Garden Party" by John Danzer for Munder Skiles.
- Haresh Lalvani: XtraD, April 2011
- Gwyneth Leech, The Cup Drawing Installation: Hypergraphia, June 2011

== Deborah Buck ==
Trained as a painter and set designer, Deborah's style is reflected in the grouping of objects at Buck House. Buck originated the concept for 'Buck House Moments': a series of curated still-life photographs including antiques, fine art and floral arrangements. An eclectic assemblage of objects, or tableaux, highlight shared formal characteristics between objects and design a moment in the world of Buck House. Exhibitions, revolving window displays, and tableaux developed at Buck House have inspired books such as Tableau and Fictional Females of Buck House and allow the public to explore, appreciate and interpret design in everyday life.

In 2013 she published The Windows of Buck House; Fabulous, Fictional Females to great acclaim.
