= Ephraim Buck House =

Historic house in Massachusetts, United States

- U.S. National Register of Historic Places
- U.S. Historic district – Contributing property
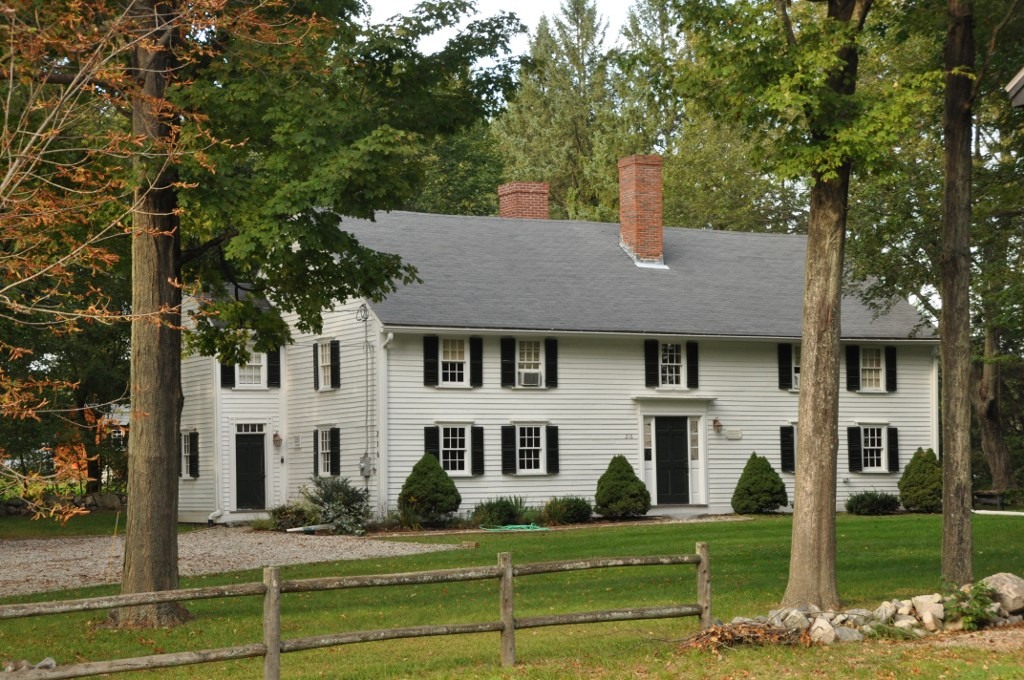

- Location within Massachusetts Location within the United States
- Location: 216 Wildwood Street, Wilmington, Massachusetts
- Coordinates: 42°32′49″N 71°9′6″W
- Built: 1670 c.1704 (MACRIS)
- Architectural style: Colonial
- Part of: Buck's Corner Historic District (ID03001209)
- MPS: First Period Buildings of Eastern Massachusetts TR
- NRHP reference No.: 90000189

Significant dates
- Added to NRHP: March 9, 1990
- Designated CP: November 21, 2003

The Ephraim Buck House is a historic First Period house in Wilmington, Massachusetts. Construction of the house has been dated to c. 1704 by deeds, although local histories suggest part of it may be older. Analysis of its framing suggests that it may have been built in phases: the first phase would have included the front half of the house, along with a central chimney, while the back portion of the house, along with a new chimney, would have been added later in the 18th century. The house is distinctive for having "Beverly jogs" on both sides of the house; this is a portion of the rear section that projects from the side of the house. The house was supposedly built by Roger Buck, an early colonial settler, and his son Ephraim, and was originally occupied by two families. Its exterior was restyled c. 1770 to give it Federal period styling, including a front door entry with 3/4 length sidelight windows and an entablature.

The house was listed on the National Register of Historic Places in 1990, and included in the Buck's Corner Historic District in 2003.

== See also ==
- List of the oldest buildings in Massachusetts
- National Register of Historic Places listings in Middlesex County, Massachusetts
