= J. M. Inman =

American politician

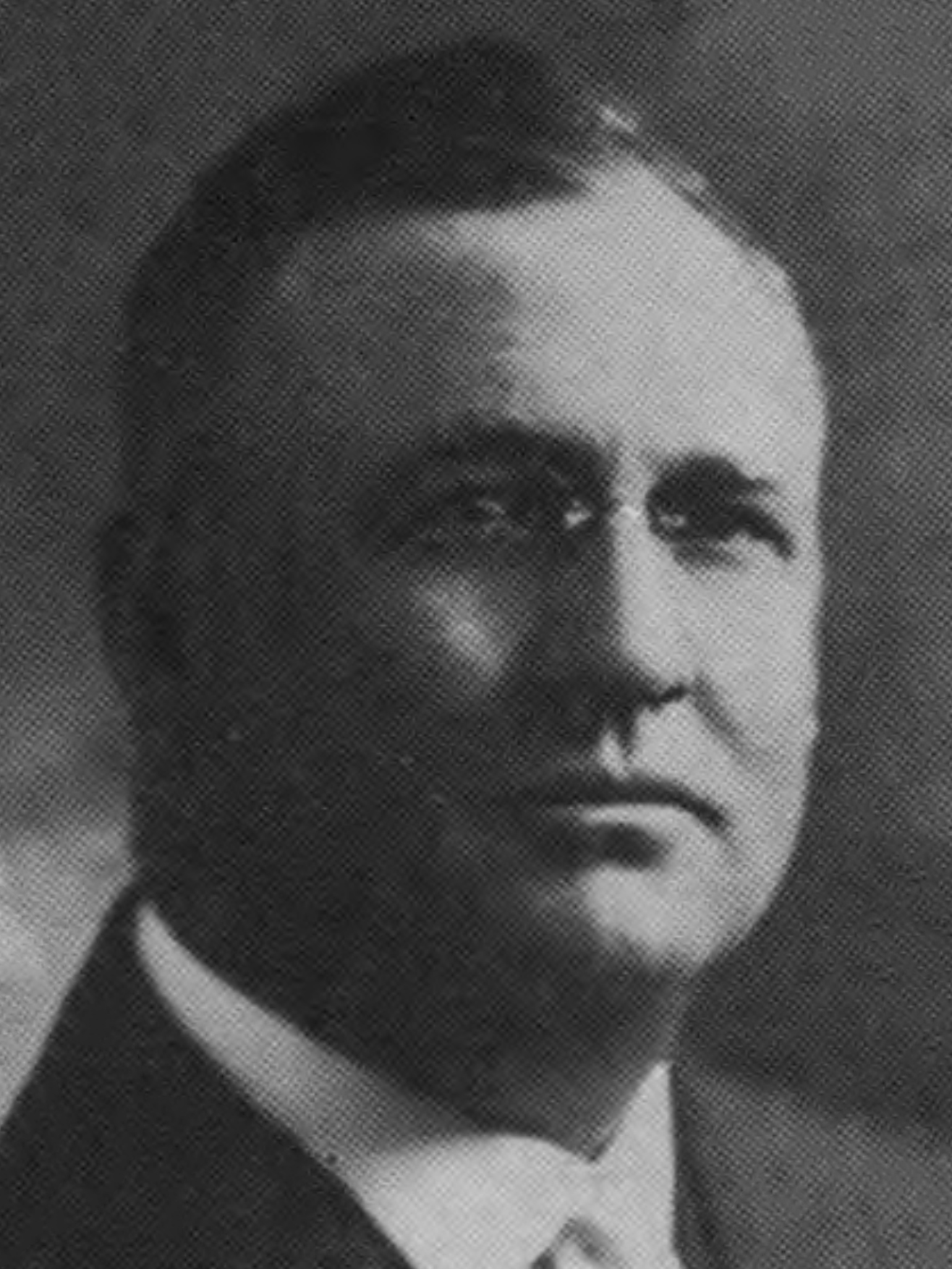

Member of the California Senate from the 19th district
- In office January 2, 1933 – September 6, 1934
- Preceded by: Tallant Tubbs
- Succeeded by: Thomas P. Scollan

Member of the California Senate from the 7th district
- In office January 8, 1917 – January 2, 1933
- Preceded by: Philip Charles Cohn
- Succeeded by: Jerrold L. Seawell

Member of the California State Assembly from the 14th district
- In office January 6, 1913 – January 4, 1915
- Preceded by: Herbert W. Slater
- Succeeded by: Walter W. Chenoweth

Personal details
- Born: December 31, 1875 Bishop, California
- Died: March 24, 1954 (aged 78) California
- Party: Republican

Military service
- Branch/service: United States Army
- Battles/wars: World War I

Joseph Manning Inman (December 31, 1875 – March 24, 1954) served in the California Assembly and Senate. From 1913–1915, Inman served in the State Assembly for the 7th district. From 1917–1934, Inman served in the Senate for the 7th and 19th district.

In 1920 Senator Inman became President of the new Japanese Exclusion League of California. During World War I he also served in the United States Army.
