= John Buckingham House =

Historic house in Massachusetts, United States

- U.S. National Register of Historic Places
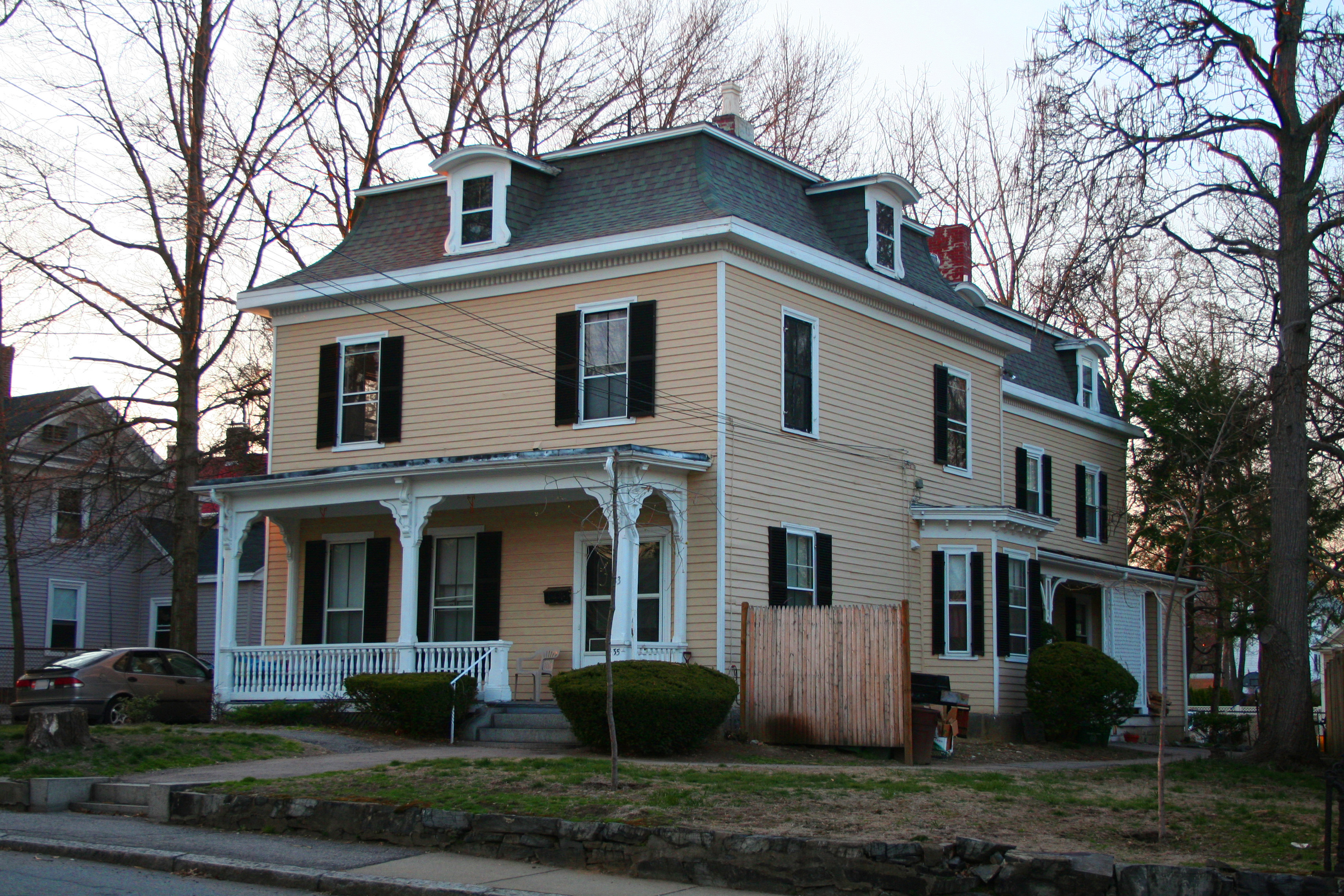

- Location within Massachusetts Location within the United States
- Location: 33–35 Waban St., Newton, Massachusetts
- Coordinates: 42°21′27″N 71°11′27″W
- Area: less than one acre
- Built: 1864
- Architectural style: Second Empire, Mansard
- MPS: Newton MRA
- NRHP reference No.: 86001778
- Added to NRHP: September 04, 1986

The John Buckingham House is a historic house at 33–35 Waban Street in the Newton Corner village of Newton, Massachusetts. Built about 1864, it is a good local example of Second Empire architecture, typical of built at that time for upper middle class commuters to Boston. It was listed on the National Register of Historic Places in 1986.

== Description and history ==
The John Buckingham House stands in a densely built residential area northwest of the center of Newton Corner, on the north side of Waban Street opposite Hovey Street. Its lot is fronted by a low stone retaining wall, which continues to a posted drive on the adjacent property, where the house's original carriage house is located. The house is a 2 1/2-story wood-frame structure, with a bell-cast mansard roof with fish-scale slate shingles and segmented-arch dormers. The cornice is denticulated, and there are single-story projecting bay windows on both sides, topped by bracketed roofs. A single-story porch extends across the front, supported by bracketed chamfered square posts; a similar porch is set on the right side near the rear.

The neighborhood was laid out sometime after the railroad arrived at Newton Corner in 1844, and may have been designed by landscape architect Alexander Wadsworth. This house is estimated to have been built c. 1864, and was bought in 1866 by John Buckingham, pastor of the Chestnut Hill Unitarian Church. It remained in his family until the 1970s. The Second Empire style house is typical of commuter-oriented housing built in Newton Corner after the American Civil War, and is notable for the surviving carriage house.

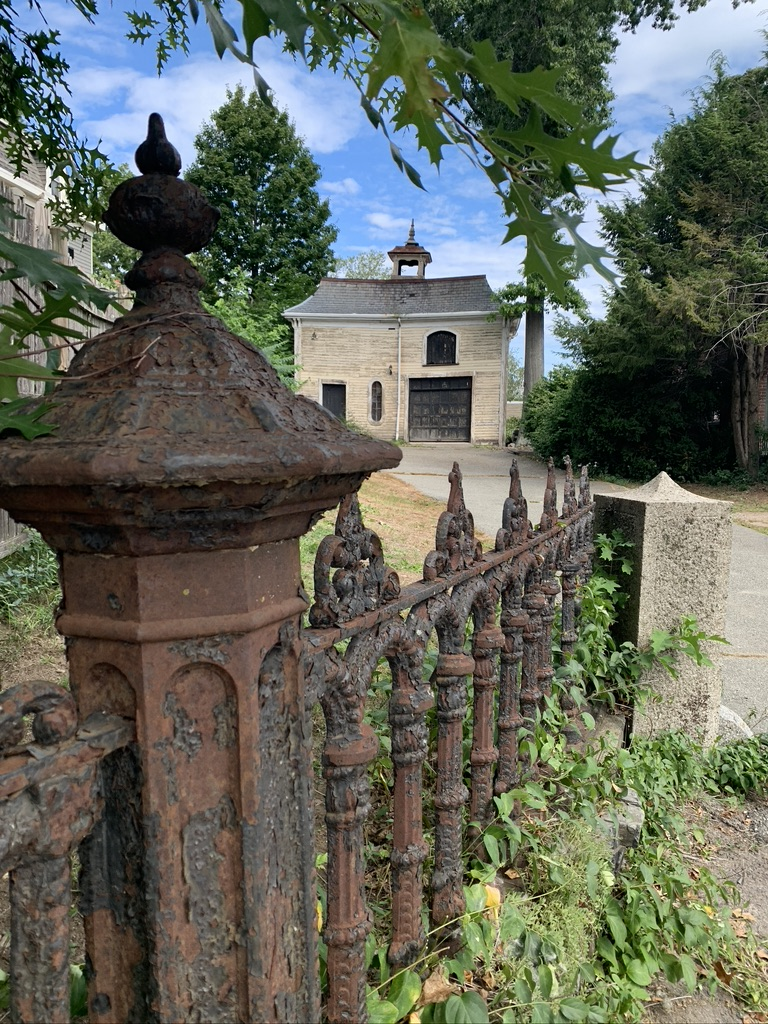
Carriage house at 35 Waban St Newton, MA with remaining portion of iron fence.

== See also ==
- National Register of Historic Places listings in Newton, Massachusetts
