= HMS Buckingham =

Four ships of the Royal Navy have been named HMS Buckingham, after George Villiers, 1st Duke of Buckingham, including:

- HMS Buckingham was a 70-gun third-rate launched in 1699 as HMS Revenge. She was renamed HMS Buckingham in 1711, was hulked in 1727 and subsequently sunk as a foundation in 1745.
- HMS Buckingham (1731) was a 70-gun third rate launched in 1731 and broken up in 1745.
- HMS Buckingham (1751) was a 70-gun third rate launched in 1751. She was renamed HMS Grampus in 1777 and was used as a store ship. She foundered in a storm in 1779.
- HMS Buckingham was a 64-gun third rate launched in 1774 as HMS Eagle. She was used for harbour service from 1790, was renamed HMS Buckingham in 1800 and was broken up in 1812.

== See also ==
- HMCS Buckingham
