= Buckingham, Florida =

- Census-designated place
- Location in Lee County and the state of Florida
- Coordinates: 26°39′45″N 81°45′15″W
- Country: United States
- State: Florida
- County: Lee

Area
  - Total: 18.25 sq mi (47.28 km^{2})
  - Land: 18.00 sq mi (46.63 km^{2})
  - Water: 0.25 sq mi (0.65 km^{2})
- Elevation: 13 ft (4.0 m)

Population (2020)
  - Total: 4,443
  - Density: 246.8/sq mi (95.28/km^{2})
- Time zone: UTC-5 (Eastern (EST))
  - Summer (DST): UTC-4 (EDT)
- FIPS code: 12-09350
- GNIS feature ID: 2402726

Buckingham is an unincorporated community and census-designated place (CDP) in Lee County, Florida, United States. The population was 4,443 at the 2020 census, up from 4,036 at the 2010 census. It is part of the Cape Coral-Fort Myers, Florida Metropolitan Statistical Area.

Historic Buckingham School is located there.

== Geography ==
Buckingham is located in northeastern Lee County. It is bordered to the southwest by Fort Myers, the county seat, and to the south and east by unincorporated Lehigh Acres.

According to the United States Census Bureau, the Buckingham CDP has a total area of 18.5 square miles (47.8 km^{2}), of which 18.2 square miles (47.2 km^{2}) are land and 0.2 square miles (0.6 km^{2}), or 1.36%, are water.

== Demographics ==
Historical population
Census	Pop.	Note	%±
2000	3,742		—
2010	4,036		7.9%
2020	4,443		10.1%
U.S. Decennial Census

=== 2020 census ===
As of the 2020 census, Buckingham had a population of 4,443. The median age was 46.0 years. 19.7% of residents were under the age of 18 and 20.0% of residents were 65 years of age or older. For every 100 females there were 97.5 males, and for every 100 females age 18 and over there were 95.7 males age 18 and over.

36.5% of residents lived in urban areas, while 63.5% lived in rural areas.

There were 1,684 households in Buckingham, of which 27.0% had children under the age of 18 living in them. Of all households, 62.4% were married-couple households, 11.6% were households with a male householder and no spouse or partner present, and 19.5% were households with a female householder and no spouse or partner present. About 17.0% of all households were made up of individuals and 8.7% had someone living alone who was 65 years of age or older.

There were 1,834 housing units, of which 8.2% were vacant. The homeowner vacancy rate was 0.7% and the rental vacancy rate was 6.3%.

Racial composition as of the 2020 census
Race	Number	Percent
White	3,727	83.9%
Black or African American	86	1.9%
American Indian and Alaska Native	12	0.3%
Asian	44	1.0%
Native Hawaiian and Other Pacific Islander	2	0.0%
Some other race	168	3.8%
Two or more races	404	9.1%
Hispanic or Latino (of any race)	557	12.5%

=== 2000 census ===
As of the census of 2000, there were 3,742 people, 1,283 households, and 1,008 families residing in the CDP. The population density was 197.3 inhabitants per square mile (76.2/km^{2}). There were 1,360 housing units at an average density of 71.7 per square mile (27.7/km^{2}). The racial makeup of the CDP was 94.20% White, 2.32% African American, 0.19% Native American, 0.51% Asian, 1.92% from other races, and 0.86% from two or more races. Hispanic or Latino of any race were 4.68% of the population.

There were 1,283 households, out of which 31.0% had children under the age of 18 living with them, 67.3% were married couples living together, 6.4% had a female householder with no husband present, and 21.4% were non-families. 15.0% of all households were made up of individuals, and 5.0% had someone living alone who was 65 years of age or older. The average household size was 2.67 and the average family size was 2.93.

In the CDP, the population was spread out, with 20.9% under the age of 18, 5.2% from 18 to 24, 32.9% from 25 to 44, 30.7% from 45 to 64, and 10.3% who were 65 years of age or older. The median age was 41 years. For every 100 females, there were 109.2 males. For every 100 females age 18 and over, there were 110.6 males.

The median income for a household in the CDP was $51,068, and the median income for a family was $55,719. Males had a median income of $33,176 versus $25,676 for females. The per capita income for the CDP was $19,103. About 6.4% of families and 16.8% of the population were below the poverty line, including 11.8% of those under age 18 and 8.8% of those age 65 or over.

== Notable person ==
John Ashley- outlaw active in southern Florida during the 1910s and 1920s.
