= Buckingham School (Buckingham, Florida) =

- U.S. National Register of Historic Places
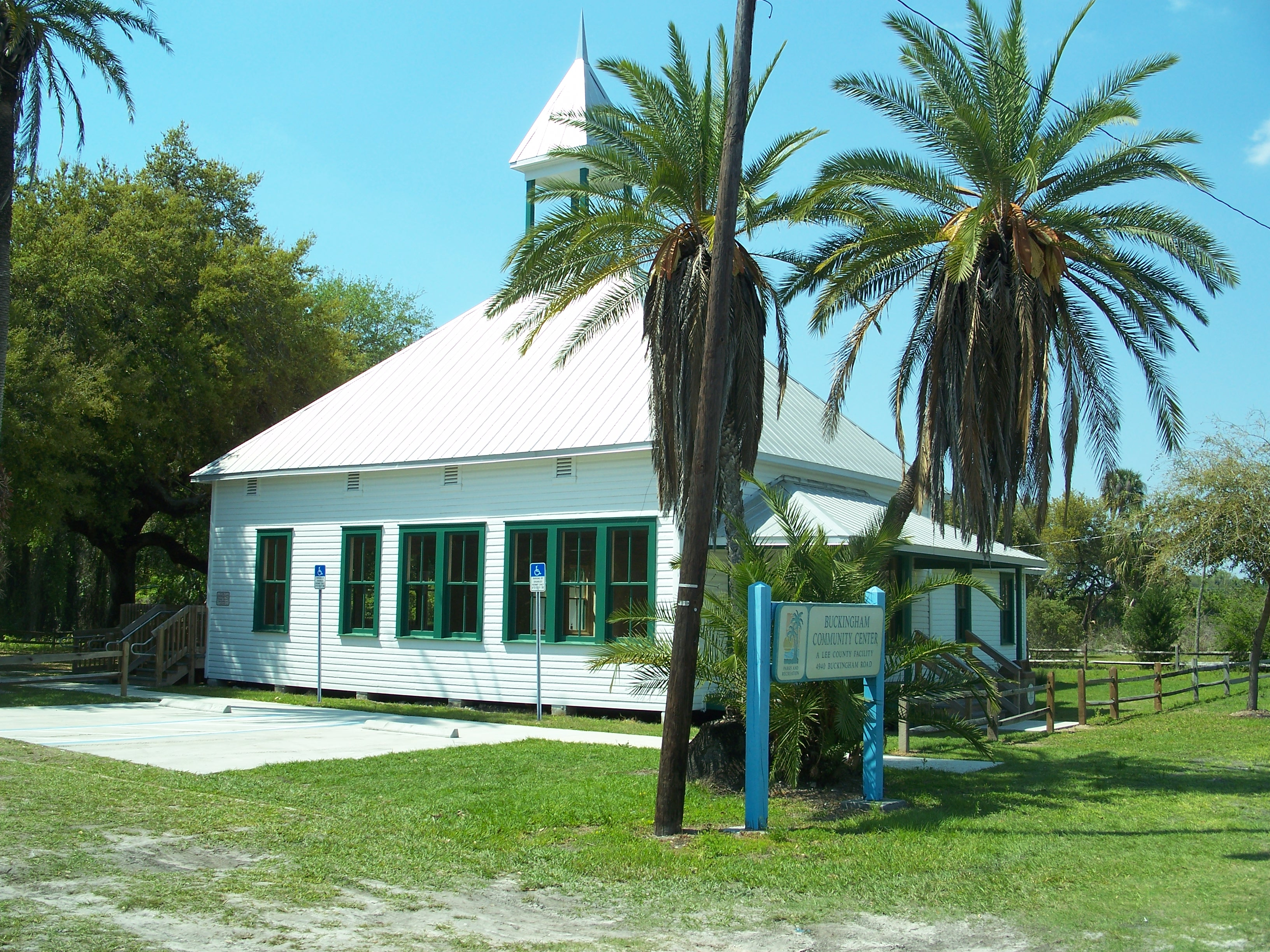

- Location within Florida Location within the United States
- Location: Buckingham, Florida
- Coordinates: 26°40′18″N 81°43′57″W
- NRHP reference No.: 89000011
- Added to NRHP: 17 February 1989

The Buckingham School (also known as the Twelve Mile Stream or Orange Creek or Orange River School) is a historic schoolhouse in Buckingham, Florida. It is located at Buckingham and Cemetery Roads. It was added to the U.S. National Register of Historic Places on 17 February 1989.
