= Frank H. Buck =

American politician (1887–1942)

Frank H. Buck Jr.
- Buck c. 1931

Member of the U.S. House of Representatives from California's 3rd district
- In office March 4, 1933 – September 17, 1942
- Preceded by: Charles F. Curry, Jr.
- Succeeded by: J. Leroy Johnson

Personal details
- Born: Frank Henry Buck Jr. September 23, 1887 Vacaville, California
- Died: September 17, 1942 (aged 54) Washington, D.C.
- Resting place: Vacaville-Elmira Cemetery
- Party: Democratic
- Spouse(s): Zayda Zabriskie; Eva M. Benson
- Children: 6

Frank Henry Buck Jr. (September 23, 1887 – September 17, 1942) was an American heir, businessman and politician. He served as a U.S. representative from California from 1933 to 1942.

== Early life ==
Frank Buck, Jr. was born on a ranch near Vacaville, California, on September 23, 1887, to Frank Henry Buck, Sr. (1859-1916) and the former Annie Elizabeth Stevenson (1862-1920).

His grandfather, Leonard W. Buck, born in 1834, founded the Buck Company, a fruit-growing company, and was elected to the California State Senate in 1882, serving until 1885 and dying a decade later. Frank Buck, Sr. played a notable role in Southern California history in 1900 when he joined with several prominent associates in the Amalgamated Oil Company to purchase Rancho Rodeo de las Aguas, renaming it Morocco Junction. After drilling for oil and only finding water, they reorganized their business into the Rodeo Land and Water Company to develop a new residential town later known as Beverly Hills.

Frank Buck, Jr. attended Vacaville High School. He was a member of Theta Delta Chi fraternity and graduated from the University of California at Berkeley in 1908 and from the law department of Harvard University in 1911. He was admitted to the bar the same year.'

== Business ==
After graduation from law school, Buck moved to Piedmont, California and opened a law practice, McNulty and Buck, in San Francisco. He was involved in business ventures including fruit growing, oil refining, and lumber, partly thanks to his inheritance. In 1916, Buck succeeded his father as the president of the Buck Company, overseeing the packing and shipping operations of the business.

He became the leader of the newly founded California Growers' and Shippers' Protective League, a lobbying organization to protect the rights of fruit and vegetable growers. In 1933, he sold the Buck Company, his grandfather's company, to the Pacific Fruit Exchange.

== Politics ==
Buck announced his first run for Congress in 1930, campaigning on a "pure wet" platform against prohibition. He ran as a write-in candidate in the general election after Republican incumbent Charles F. Curry died having secured both major-party nominations under California's cross-filing system of the time. Buck finished a poor third with 11% of the vote behind two other write-ins: Curry's son, Charles F. Curry, Jr. (who won with 53%), and State Senator Joseph M. Inman (33%).

In 1932, Buck announced his second run for Congress. In the Democratic primary campaign, he ran on a platform of improving unemployment, providing economic relief, reducing gangsterism and repealing the 18th Amendment. Buck won the primary by a 2 to 1 margin against Sacramento attorney Sheridan Downey (who would bounce back to be elected a U.S. Senator in 1938). In the general election against Charles Curry, Jr., Buck focused on his support of Franklin D. Roosevelt's promised New Deal, rehabilitation of Mather Field, development of Mare Island Naval Shipyard and various waterway projects in Sacramento and San Joaquin counties. Buck decisively defeated Curry, Jr. 57%-43%.

=== First term (73rd Congress) ===
During Buck's first term, he served on the Agriculture Committee (the first Californian to serve on the committee in 42 years), where he worked to lower Cuban tariffs as part of the Reciprocal Trade Agreement Act, a move credited with boosting the California agriculture industry by opening the door for exports of American produce. He worked to lower taxes on grape production and protect agricultural crops with federal rodent mitigation funds.

Buck's fight to lower taxes on wine and beer was anchored in the belief that prohibition was fueling lawlessness and bootlegging; his aim was to redirect consumers back toward legal alcohol and lower production costs for producers. Buck was a main player in the push to stimulate California's approximately 130 wineries that stayed open during prohibition. With the spending of $5 million, the state's wineries increased to 314 with a cumulative output of 30 million gallons of wine compared to the prior year's 12,000. It led to the creation of 12,000 winery jobs in one year. In the first quarter of 1933, Buck lobbied federal prohibition authorities to allow California wineries to operate medicinal dispensaries throughout the U.S. to fill wine prescriptions of up to 10 percent alcohol.

Buck also secured funding for a new, deeper channel in Stockton, and for improvements to Mare Island and additions to the fleet stationed there. He also secured funding for flood control in the Sacramento River Valley.

He also directed federal funding toward the rehabilitation of Mather Field, which had been abandoned and marked for possible demolition the year prior due to poor economic conditions and military spending shift toward naval efforts. Buck wanted the base kept open for flight training and defense readiness.

=== Second term (74th Congress) ===
In the 1934 general election, State Senator Joseph M. Inman was Buck's opponent (they had both been defeated as write-ins in 1930). Both cross-filed in the Republican and Democratic primaries but Inman handily won the Republican primary and almost won the Democratic primary. Inman opposed a new reciprocal trade agreement, arguing that other nations’ products would undercut U.S. produce markets. Other opponents of the bill in Congress also argued produce imports (in weight) far exceeded the exports. However, Buck argued the dollar value of exports was much closer to the import comparison and the bill was intended to help industries hurt by the tariffs placed on exports between 1929 and 1934. Analysis of produce prices several years after the bill was passed showed price increases for many produce sectors, including but not limited to fresh, dried and canned fruit, and other canned produce. Buck won overall by around 10,000 votes (53%-46%) and carried every county except Sacramento.

During his second term, Buck became a close ally of President Roosevelt, supporting much of his Social Security agenda and New Deal policies. These policies gained popularity with Buck's constituents after the economic hardships of the Depression. He was an advocate for permanently implementing “a broad, progressive program of social reform and social legislation.” Buck became the first California Democrat elected to the House Ways and Means Committee (with 281 out of 304 Democratic votes), dealing with taxes and tariffs. Some notable second-term bills he supported were the Banking Act of 1935, the Social Security Act and the public utilities regulation bill. The Social Security legislation allotted $15 per month for households needing relief. However, Buck also believed that California should not be responsible for the poor, jobless transients who had made their way westward following the Depression. He supported policies that would instead task the federal government with providing welfare.

He also supported a bill that would reduce federal taxes on beer and wine by fifty percent (HR 9185), resulting in a tax revenue decrease of $2.5M. He also drafted legislation bolstering agricultural quarantine laws to protect crops from infected plant imports. He ran his campaign on his lobbying efforts for federal dollars that ultimately funded improvements to the San Joaquin River channel (deepening it), the Sacramento River channel, post offices in his district, projects at Mare Island Navy Yard (Buck had worked to allocate the construction of three naval heavy cruisers there) and improvements to Mather Field, where employment was at 5,000—an all-time high for peacetime. He was credited with aiding the Vinson Adjusted Compensation Law and Railway Retirement Pension Act.

Water projects were especially important to Buck's constituents as all navigable rivers in California, except the upper Sacramento River, were in the third district. Buck was also credited with legislation like the Emergency Farm Mortgage Act (1933) which allowed irrigation and reclamation districts to refinance and H.R. 9484 which allowed those districts to more easily borrow for rehabilitation of infrastructure. Both bills were aimed at financial recovery of the districts Buck represented and resembled Roosevelt's administrative agenda. Buck's second term was often spoken by his supporters to be for the purpose of supporting Roosevelt's policies. This mirroring of Roosevelt's strategy sometimes negatively impacted moderate perception. As was the case when Buck announced his opposition to the Townsend Bill, a piece of legislation that was advertised as being the method of solving national debt brought on by expanded unemployment aid. By the end of his second term, Buck reported to President Roosevelt, “The depression definitely is over in California... Building booms are in progress in Sacramento, Stockton and several other valley cities, while in a number of counties nobody is on relief any more.”

=== Third term (75th Congress) ===
During the election, Buck ran on a platform touting his record as supporter of Roosevelt's New Deal policies, Central Valley Water project, tax reductions on the grape industry, funding for the Ben Ali Air Repair Depot ($7,000,000), Mather Field and Vallejo Naval Yard. During the campaign, Buck was also said to have written speeches that were used by the Democratic National Committee. Sheridan Downey opposed buck during the primary election. One of Downey's campaign points, his support of the Townsend plan, was challenged by Buck, claiming the plan promised monetary handouts that were not possible. Buck also charged that Downey's destructive attitude would not have allowed for the social programs that Buck had supported during his first two terms to succeed. Downey largely focused on discrediting Buck for recent legislation (i.e. Wine bill, Sacramento air depot). Buck also had the support of many labor groups and trade unions. Buck largely promised to continue where he left off if elected. Bumper stickers and windshield stickers advertising his re-election was exhausted in supply during the first day. In the primary election, Buck filed on both Democratic and Republican tickets. He won the primary 34,155 to 23,001 in the Democratic Primary and 14,912 to 13,472 in the Republican Primary. Following Buck's election to the third district, there was speculation that he would run for governor after he said he was “on the fence” – he ultimately decided not to enter the race.

Buck piloted a bill to tax marijuana dealers, saying that the drug is “raised commercially for legitimate purposes to some extent” and “used to a very limited extent by the medical profession.” The bill, federal Marihuana Act, made possession of a narcotic (including marijuana) a federal offense. Buck also voiced opposition to a bill that would require married households to file taxes together (lumping of incomes). Buck also supported a bill meant to stimulate economic growth by cutting taxes on businesses with less than $25,000 in profits. He introduced a bill to allow operation of distilleries on Sundays and further lower taxes on the industry. The bill included abatement of tax on wine lost due to evaporation during production. Buck advocated for more flood control in the northern and central parts of the state after a year of large rainfall that caused damage to roads and bridges. He also advocated for the protection of migratory birds and increased game warden staffing. On the agricultural front, he drafted a bill that reduced produce shippers’ liability in railroad shipments. Buck fought to add an additional federal judge for California's northern district. He argued the southern district had six judges while the northern district only had four. A backlog of cases for the northern judges was also beginning to pile up, creating delays with civil litigation. A $500,000 bill was passed by Buck to improve Mare Island (specifically, an industrial storehouse and construction of several watercraft). During his third term, he was at the groundbreaking ceremony at Mare Island for a $3,500,000 project that included a new dry dock. Buck opposed Roosevelt's program to enlarge the Supreme Court from nine to fifteen members. He believed public opinion was not supportive and the change would delay court cases further. However, Buck expressed support for a constitutional amendment limiting term length. Buck was also a member of the House Select Committee on the Conservation of Wildlife Resources. He was keenly interested in preserving the wildlife of California. Buck lobbied for the Sacramento Deep Water Ship Canal and Harbor development project due to the large amount of food produced in the Sacramento Valley. 168,206 tons of canned fruits and vegetables, 140,453 tons of beet sugar and 180,720 tons of rice were grown or produced in the Valley, most sent through the nearby ports.

=== Fourth term (76th Congress) ===
During the race for Buck's fourth term, he faced Nora Conklin (Communist Party) and George Kimber (Republican and professor at Sacramento Jr. College). One newspaper said Buck deserved to be re-elected year after year until his death, much like prior congressman Charles F. Curry was continuously re-elected until his death. This was the first election since Buck's consideration for governorship, for which he did not enter the race. Buck ran for nomination in both parties. In campaign narratives, there was significantly less mention of Roosevelt. In 1938, Buck claimed the war in Europe would not involve the U.S. before 1940 and the war would likely help Roosevelt in his re-election bid. During his fourth term, Buck was also considered for Secretary of Navy after the death of former Secretary Charles Swanson. He was high on the list for consideration due to his association with Mare Island Navy Yard. California had also not been represented in the presidential cabinet since Ray Lyman Wilbur was Secretary of the Interior in 1929. Buck helped pass a bill to prevent retroactive taxation after public employees became liable for Federal income tax. Buck authored an excess profits taxation to “assure proper treatment of investors” and raise money for wartime efforts and infrastructure. The issue of increased freight rates for fruit growers was also a topic during this term. Buck believed the shipping industry was often short-sided about setting rates and mentioned rates had gone up since the start of the world war. He also fought for the renewal of the Reciprocal Trade Agreement, first passed in 1934 and renewed in 1937. He argued the agricultural industries of the country benefited from increased foreign demand and thus increased labor demand. Buck introduced a congressional bill to add a fourth, $1,750,00 drydock at Mare Island. He received a plaque for 100,000 logged miles using air travel.

=== Fifth term (77th Congress) ===
In 1940, Buck hypothesized that the U.S. would be brought into the war through an enemy attack via South America or the Panama Canal. He was also supportive of allied ship toward Russia due to negative impacts of a potential German invasion of the Soviet Union. Buck was against congressional moves to reduce the size of the Third District by removing San Joaquin County due to a population increase in the district. He was also against a bill to force households into joint filing of federal taxes. Buck was also against changes to the Reciprocal Trade Agreement that allowed imports of almonds from Iran and Spain, arguing it would decimate California's almond industry.

=== Primary election for sixth term ===
In 1942 Buck ran against two Democrats, State Assemblyman Edward Cain and John Stewart, the mayor of Vallejo, and Republicans A.J. Barcena and J. Leroy Johnson. During the campaign, Buck was advertised as having voted for all defense legislation long before the attack on Pearl Harbor. He had voted to fortify Guam, repeal the arms embargo, relax the Neutrality Acts, extend trade pacts, enact a draft law, arm merchant ships, and reopen the combat zone (enabling U.S. ships to be sent to Allied ports), and for Lend-Lease.

Another recurring topic during the campaign was Buck's health. Many Sacramento politicians urged others to run before Buck announced his re-election bid. Cain criticized Buck for his unexplained extended absences in California, taking the opportunity to boast of Cain's 100% attendance in the Legislature. State Senator Harold Swan wrote to Buck, telling him to resign due to his poor health and calling Buck's private life an "unspeakable scandal."

Buck responded by criticizing Swan's record in the Legislature, demanding that Swan himself resign and vowing to return to California in good health. Upon his return, Buck prepared to sue Swan for libel. The Sacramento Bee, which had endorsed Buck in his last three elections, published an editorial explaining they would not be endorsing him due to his "conduct in Washington" for which friends and supporters had pleaded with him to resign. The Bee claimed Buck was often absent from his Washington office for days at a time and inaccessible to their reporters. The Napa Register, a publication that had endorsed Buck for the previous four elections, urged voters to oust him in an editorial, citing similar incidents.

On August 25, Buck barely won the Democratic nomination over Cain but lost the Republican nomination to Johnson. Buck died shortly after winning the primary. He was replaced on the general-election ballot by Joseph B. O'Neil, who lost to Johnson.

=== Political accolades ===
He served as a delegate to the Democratic National Conventions in 1928, 1936, and 1940. He served in Congress from March 4, 1933, until his death in Washington, D.C., on September 17, 1942. He is credited with naming the Social Security program.

== Personal life ==
He married Zayda Zabriskie (daughter of Christian Brevoort Zabriskie) on April 18, 1911. They had four children, Frank Henry Buck III (1912–1993), Margaret Ann Buck (born 1913), Christian Brevoort Zabriskie Buck (1914–1995) and Edward Zabriskie Elvis Buck (1917–1964). After they divorced, he married Eva Mathilde Benson in 1926, and they had two children, William Benson Buck and Carol Franc Buck (born 1936).

=== Death ===
Frank H. Buck died of apoplexy in Garfield Hospital in Washington, D.C., at the age of 54 on September 17, 1942. He had suffered a stroke at his residence in the Wardman-Park Hotel and was rushed to the hospital. Dr. William D. Claudy, attending physician at the hotel, said Buck had suffered from chronic high blood pressure and heart disease. His funeral was at the Vacaville Community Church at 3:30 pm on September 28, 1942. Rev. A. F. Fruhling, pastor, conducted the rites. Buck was buried in the family plot at the Vacaville-Elmira Cemetery. Following his death, Buck's estate was valued at $500,000 but was later declared to be $1,614,659.11 in a 66-page report filed by Leonard W. Buck, the executor in the estate. In his will, Buck left money for his fraternity, church, children, wife and a meaningful sum of money for his two secretaries. A short battle in court over the shares of oil stock granted to Buck's friend, Helen S. Peterson was clarified after the judge ruled changes had been made to Buck's stock portfolio since the will was drafted. As a result, Peterson did not receive any shares and the remaining shares went to Buck's children. The Buck ranch in Vacaville was sold for $100,000. Another, 456-acre ranch south of Vacaville (Hawkins Ranch) sold for $65,000. In 1947, the land was purchased by the State of California for the California Medical Facility prison hospital.

=== Foundation ===
His wife, Eva Benson Buck, founded the Frank H. Buck Scholarship, which is awarded each year to eight to 16 high school seniors, who have to live in his former congressional district. She was an active philanthropist until her death in 1990.

== Electoral history ==
1932 United States House of Representatives elections
Party	Candidate	Votes	%
Democratic	Frank H. Buck	61,694	56.8
Republican	Charles F. Curry, Jr. (Incumbent)	46,887	43.2
Total votes		108,581	100.0
Democratic gain from Republican			

1934 United States House of Representatives elections
Party	Candidate	Votes	%
Democratic	Frank H. Buck (Incumbent)	66,566	53.3
Republican	J.M. Inman	56,222	45.7
Communist	Albert Hougardy	1,167	1.0
Total votes		122,955	100.0
Democratic hold			

1936 United States House of Representatives elections
Party	Candidate	Votes	%
Democratic	Frank H. Buck (Incumbent)	93,110	90.6
Independent	Walter Schaefer (write-in)	5,310	5.2
Communist	Perry Hill	4,390	4.2
Total votes		98,810	100.0
Democratic hold			

1938 United States House of Representatives elections
Party	Candidate	Votes	%
Democratic	Frank H. Buck (Incumbent)	119,236	93.3
Communist	Nora Conklin	8,271	6.5
Independent	Walter Schaefer (write-in)	327	0.2
Total votes		127,834	100.0
Democratic hold			

1940 United States House of Representatives elections
Party	Candidate	Votes	%
Democratic	Frank H. Buck (Incumbent)	135,461	91.0
Prohibition	C. H. Farman	10,539	7.1
Communist	Charles Gricus	2,751	1.8
No party	George Kimber (write-in)	122	0.1
Total votes		148,873	100.0
Democratic hold			

== See also ==
- List of members of the United States Congress who died in office (1900–1949)

U.S. House of Representatives
Preceded by Charles F. Curry, Jr.	Member of the U.S. House of Representatives from California's 3rd congressional district 1933–1942	Succeeded by J. Leroy Johnson
