= Leonard W. Buck =

American politician

Member of the California Senate from the 19th district
- In office February 16, 1883 - January 5, 1885
- Preceded by: Jonathan M. Dudley
- Succeeded by: William Boyd Parker; Martin Jeremiah Wright

Personal details
- Born: July 8, 1834 Truxton, New York, U.S.
- Died: June 4, 1895 (aged 60) Oakland, California, U.S.
- Resting place: Mountain View Cemetery
- Party: Democratic
- Spouse: Anna M. Bellows
- Children: 2 sons, 3 daughters
- Relatives: Frank H. Buck (grandson)
- Occupation: Businessman, rancher, politician

Military service
- Branch/service: Union Army
- Years of service: 1862-1863
- Rank: Lieutenant
- Battles/wars: American Civil War

Leonard W. Buck (July 8, 1834 - June 4, 1895) was an American businessman, rancher and politician.

== Early life ==
Leonard W. Buck was born on July 8, 1834, in Trenton, New York. He was raised on a farm and educated at the Courtland Academy in Homer, New York. During the American Civil War, he served as a Lieutenant in Company H, 175th New York Infantry Regiment from 1862 to 1863. Buck eventually resigned the military in February 1863 due to poor health.

== Career ==
Buck was a salesman of hardware goods in Clinton, Iowa from 1865 to 1873. He lost "all he processed" during the financial panic of 1873.

Buck established a 166-acre ranch from a plot of land known as Weldon Rancho in Vacaville, California in 1874. He also established a ranch in Lodi, California (400 acres purchased from B.F. Langford in 1887). He grew fruit, especially tokay grapes and peaches. Buck pioneered the fruit shipping industry and is credited with sending California fruit to east coast markets. He is also credited with bringing the Decker Peach to the northern California region.

In 1882, Buck announced his candidacy for State Senate. His opponent, Jonathan M. Dudley, was originally declared the winner. However, Buck was ultimately declared the winner after an investigation found voting irregularities in Vallejo. Buck served in the California State Senate from 1883 to 1885. He founded the California Fruit Union in 1885 (disbanded in 1894) and served as Vice President of the California State Board of Horticulture. Additionally, he served on the board of directors of the Bank of Vacaville.

In a 1888 interview with the Napa County Reporter, Buck expressed his displeasure with the U.S. Treasury's monetary tightening. He proposed two solutions – reduce import duties or abolish the whisky tax. He was quoted, “people of the United States will never tolerate taking the tax of whisky…”. Several decades later, his grandson, Senator Frank H. Buck, became a main figure in the fight against abolition and lowering taxes on domestic alcohol.

== Personal life ==
Buck married Anna M. Bellows on September 10, 1856. They had two sons: Frank H. Buck and Fred M. Buck, and three daughters, Mrs. J. B. Corey, Emma L. Buck and Anna M. Buck. They resided at 929 Adeline Street in Oakland, California from 1887 onward.

Buck was a Freemason, and he served as the master of the Vacaville lodge in 1884. He often used the pen name "Nel" (Len spelled backwards) in personal writings. Emma Buck and Mrs. Bellows sustained bruising after they were accidentally thrown from a horse and buggy in 1880.

== Death ==
Buck was accidentally thrown from a horse and buggy on June 3, 1895, at the intersection of 12th Street and Castro Street in Oakland, California. He suffered a fractured skull in the accident and died of a cerebral hemorrhage the next day at his home in Oakland, California. He was buried at the Mountain View Cemetery in Oakland. By the time of his death, he was worth an estimated US$300,000.
