= Old Burying Ground (Watertown, Massachusetts) =

Historic cemetery in Massachusetts, United States

- U.S. National Register of Historic Places
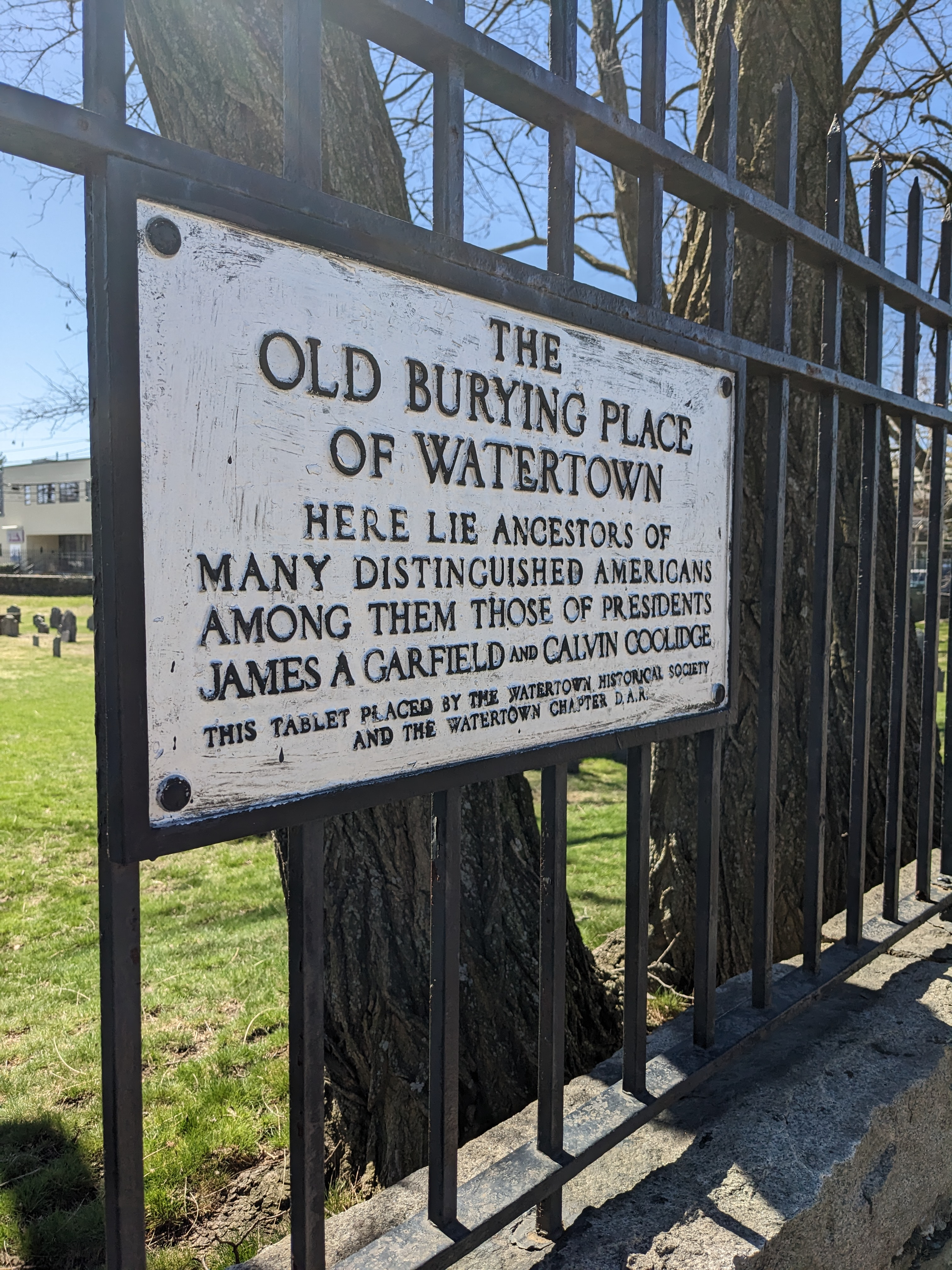

- Location within Massachusetts Location within the United States
- Location: Arlington and Mt. Auburn Streets, Watertown, Massachusetts
- Coordinates: 42°22′17″N 71°9′21″W
- Area: 1.24 acres (0.50 ha)
- Built: 1665
- NRHP reference No.: 100007388
- Added to NRHP: February 3, 2022

The Old Burying Ground is the oldest documented cemetery in Watertown, Massachusetts, United States. Located at the junction of Arlington and Mount Auburn Streets in eastern Watertown, its oldest documented grave site dates to 1665, and it remained in active use into the 20th century. It was the town's first formal cemetery, and remained its only one until 1754, when the Common Street Cemetery was established. The cemetery was listed on the National Register of Historic Places in 2022.

== Description and history ==
Watertown's Old Burying Ground occupies 1.24 acres (0.50 ha) of relatively flat terrain at the southeast corner of Arlington and Mount Auburn Streets. It is a roughly trapezoidal parcel, with fieldstone walls on the street-facing edges, surmounted by metal picket fencing. The cemetery is grassy, with a scattering of trees in the interior and near the perimeters. There is no formal circulation pattern within the walls; foot access is via a gate on Arlington Street. There are estimated to be more than 300 burials.

When Watertown was founded by English colonists in 1630, its first town center was located near Gerry's Landing on the Charles River. This town center included a small burying ground, which does not appear to have survived. The town center eventually migrated to the junction of Arlington and Mount Auburn Streets, with the meeting house north of Mount Auburn Street and the burying ground to the south. About 1750 the town center moved again, to its present location at Watertown Square, at which time the Common Street Cemetery was established. The Old Burying Ground continued in active use into the 20th century. Prominent markers include a memorial to Joseph Coolidge, a militia soldier who died in the 1775 Battles of Lexington and Concord who was an ancestor of President Calvin Coolidge.

== See also ==
- National Register of Historic Places listings in Middlesex County, Massachusetts
