= Common Street Cemetery =

Historic cemetery in Massachusetts, United States

- U.S. National Register of Historic Places
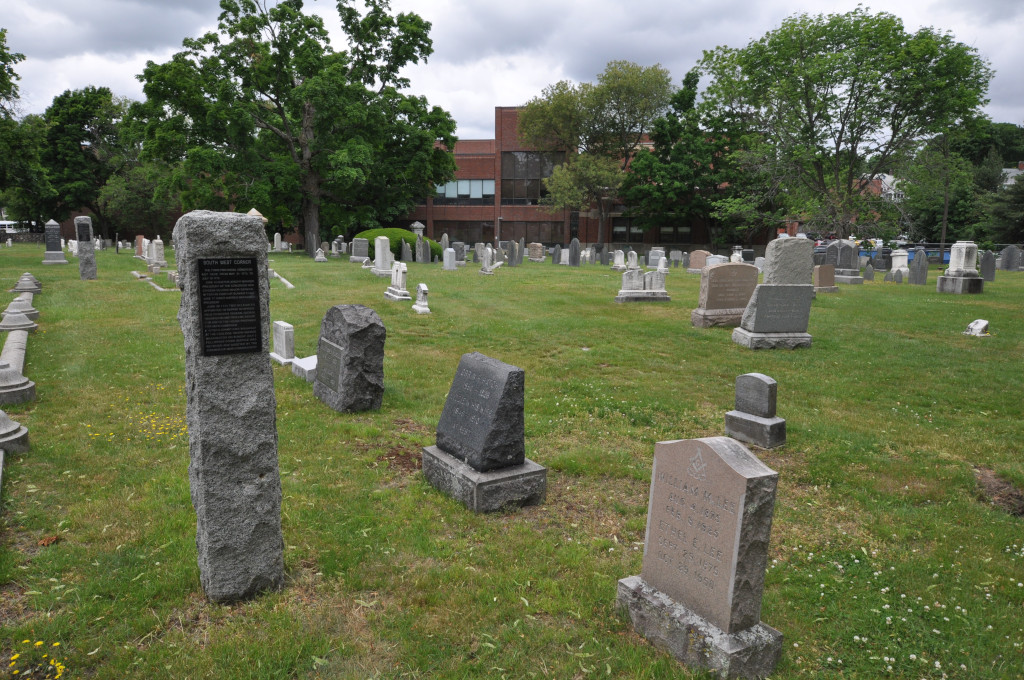
- View of cemetery with marker showing location of one corner of the meetinghouse

- Location within Massachusetts Location within the United States
- Location: Common and Mt. Auburn Streets, Watertown, Massachusetts
- Coordinates: 42°22′6″N 71°10′42″W
- Area: 2.8 acres (1.1 ha)
- Built: 1665
- Architect: Gray, Arthur F.
- NRHP reference No.: 100007387
- Added to NRHP: February 3, 2022

The Common Street Cemetery is the second-oldest documented cemetery in Watertown, Massachusetts. Located at the junction of Common and Mount Auburn Streets in central Watertown, it was founded in 1754. It is the site of Watertown's second meeting house, where major planning and resistance activities took place in the early days of the American Revolutionary War. The cemetery was listed on the National Register of Historic Places in 2022.

== Description and history ==
Watertown's Common Street Cemetery occupies 2.8 acres (1.1 ha) of relatively flat terrain at the northwest corner of Common and Mount Auburn Streets, just northeast of Watertown Square. It is a roughly triangular parcel, its rear property lines abutting the Watertown High School and a residential area. A paved road provides circulation access within the cemetery, in which graves are lined up in neat rows separated by grass. There are estimated to be more than 500 burials.

When Watertown was founded by English colonists in 1630, its first town center was located near Gerry's Landing on the Charles River. This town center included a small burying ground, which does not appear to have survived. The town center eventually migrated to the junction of Arlington and Mount Auburn Streets, with the meeting house north of Mount Auburn Street and what is now the Old Burying Ground to the south. About 1750 the town center moved again, to its present location at Watertown Square, at which time the Common Street Cemetery was established. The cemetery was originally smaller, and part of a larger town-owned area used as common pasturage and the site of the town's second meeting house. During the American Revolutionary War, the meeting house was the site of significant planning and strategy meetings during the Siege of Boston. The site of meeting house was eventually added to the cemetery, as was part of the pastureland.

== See also ==
- National Register of Historic Places listings in Middlesex County, Massachusetts
