= Littleton Common, Massachusetts =

- Census-designated place
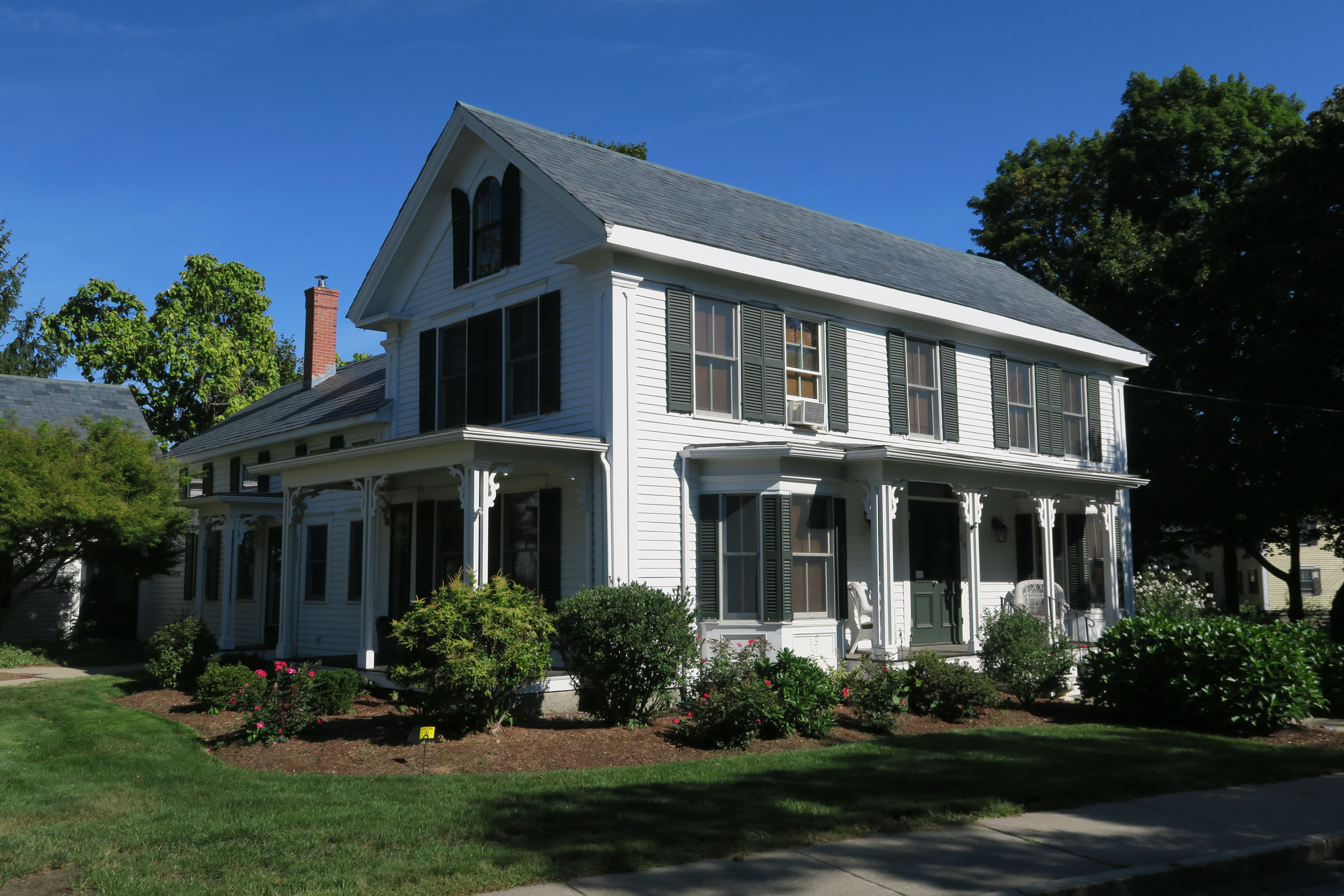
- Reed-Wood Place

- Location in Middlesex County in Massachusetts
- Coordinates: 42°32′46″N 71°28′22.72″W
- Country: United States
- State: Massachusetts
- County: Middlesex
- Town: Littleton

Area
  - Total: 3.70 sq mi (9.59 km^{2})
  - Land: 3.54 sq mi (9.17 km^{2})
  - Water: 0.16 sq mi (0.42 km^{2})
- Elevation: 266 ft (81 m)

Population (2020)
  - Total: 3,065
  - Density: 865.9/sq mi (334.33/km^{2})
- Time zone: UTC-5 (Eastern (EST))
  - Summer (DST): UTC-4 (EDT)
- ZIP Code: 01460 (Littleton)
- FIPS code: 25-36020
- GNIS feature ID: 0611250

Littleton Common is a census-designated place (CDP) in the town of Littleton in Middlesex County, Massachusetts, United States. The population was 3,065 at the 2020 census, up from 2,789 in 2010.

== Geography ==
Littleton Common is located in northwestern Middlesex County at 42°32′46″N 71°28′23″W (42.536606, -71.471984), in the eastern part of the town Littleton. It is bordered to the northeast by the town of Westford and to the northwest by Interstate 495, with access from Exit 79 (Routes 2A and 110) and Exit 80 (Route 119). It is bordered to the southwest by Harwood Avenue and to the southeast by Newtown Road, Shaker Lane, and Power Road.

Massachusetts Route 2A and 110 (King Street) go to the west out of the community, leading 7 miles (11 km) to Ayer, and Routes 2A and 119 (Great Road) leave to the southeast, leading 7 miles (11 km) to West Concord. Route 110 leads northeast 10 miles (16 km) to Lowell, and Route 119 leads northwest 7 miles (11 km) to Groton.

According to the United States Census Bureau, the CDP has a total area of 3.70 square miles (9.58 km^{2}), of which 3.54 square miles (9.17 km^{2}) are land and 0.16 square miles (0.41 km^{2}) (4.40%) are water. Long Pond is in the southern part of the community. Beaver Brook flows northward through the western side, part of the Merrimack River watershed.

== Demographics ==
Historical population
Census	Pop.	Note	%±
1950	1,017		—
1960	2,277		123.9%
1970	2,764		21.4%
1980	3,109		12.5%
1990	2,867		−7.8%
2000	2,816		−1.8%
2010	2,789		−1.0%
2020	3,065		9.9%
U.S. Decennial Census

=== 2020 census ===
As of the 2020 census, Littleton Common had a population of 3,065. The median age was 45.0 years. 20.8% of residents were under the age of 18 and 18.5% of residents were 65 years of age or older. For every 100 females there were 90.3 males, and for every 100 females age 18 and over there were 87.8 males age 18 and over.

96.6% of residents lived in urban areas, while 3.4% lived in rural areas.

There were 1,241 households in Littleton Common, of which 30.6% had children under the age of 18 living in them. Of all households, 53.7% were married-couple households, 14.2% were households with a male householder and no spouse or partner present, and 26.3% were households with a female householder and no spouse or partner present. About 25.9% of all households were made up of individuals and 12.4% had someone living alone who was 65 years of age or older.

There were 1,287 housing units, of which 3.6% were vacant. The homeowner vacancy rate was 0.8% and the rental vacancy rate was 3.3%.

Racial composition as of the 2020 census
Race	Number	Percent
White	2,655	86.6%
Black or African American	39	1.3%
American Indian and Alaska Native	2	0.1%
Asian	170	5.5%
Native Hawaiian and Other Pacific Islander	0	0.0%
Some other race	35	1.1%
Two or more races	164	5.4%
Hispanic or Latino (of any race)	93	3.0%

=== 2000 census ===
At the 2000 census there were 2,816 people in 1,098 households, including 774 families, in the CDP. The population density was 311.5/km^{2} (807.1/mi^{2}). There were 1,142 housing units at an average density of 126.3/km^{2} (327.3/mi^{2}). The racial makeup of the CDP was 97.02% White, 0.28% African American, 0.07% Native American, 1.31% Asian, 0.04% Pacific Islander, 0.25% from other races, and 1.03% from two or more races. Hispanic or Latino of any race were 1.21%.

Of the 1,098 households 32.3% had children under the age of 18 living with them, 58.6% were married couples living together, 8.8% had a female householder with no husband present, and 29.5% were non-families. 23.6% of households were one person and 9.2% were one person aged 65 or older. The average household size was 2.56 and the average family size was 3.05.

The age distribution was 24.0% under the age of 18, 5.1% from 18 to 24, 34.1% from 25 to 44, 23.9% from 45 to 64, and 12.9% 65 or older. The median age was 39 years. For every 100 females, there were 91.8 males. For every 100 females age 18 and over, there were 93.2 males.

The median household income was $60,323 and the median family income was $69,375. Males had a median income of $46,806 versus $38,571 for females. The per capita income for the CDP was $26,966. About 4.7% of families and 5.2% of the population were below the poverty line, including 1.9% of those under age 18 and 4.9% of those age 65 or over.
