= Massachusetts Route 113 =

State highway in Massachusetts, US

Route 113
- Route 113 highlighted in red

Route information
- Maintained by MassDOT
- Length: 50.53 mi (81.32 km)
- Existed: by 1930–present

Major junctions
- West end: Route 119 in Pepperell
- US 3 in Tyngsborough; I-93 / Route 110 / Route 213 in Methuen; I-495 in Haverhill; I-95 in Newburyport
- East end: US 1 / Route 1A in Newburyport

Location
- Country: United States
- State: Massachusetts
- Counties: Middlesex, Essex

Highway system
- Massachusetts State Highway System; Interstate; US; State
← Route 112	→ Route 114

Route 113 is a 50.53-mile-long (81.32 km) east–west Massachusetts state route that connects towns in the Merrimack River valley in northeastern Massachusetts. Its western terminus is at Route 119 in Pepperell, and its eastern end is at U.S. Route 1 (US 1) and Route 1A in Newburyport.

== Route description ==
Route 113 begins at Route 119 in Pepperell. It heads eastward through the center of town, intersecting Route 111 and crossing the Nashua River before continuing eastward into Dunstable. Route 113 acts as the main route through town, crossing the Salmon Brook before going through the town's center. It then enters Tyngsborough, where it meets U.S. Route 3 at Exit 90. At Middlesex Street, Route 113 becomes concurrent with Route 3A, passing over the Merrimack River with that route before splitting along a new alignment named Charles Chronopoulos Way, then turning southward along Pawtucket Boulevard.

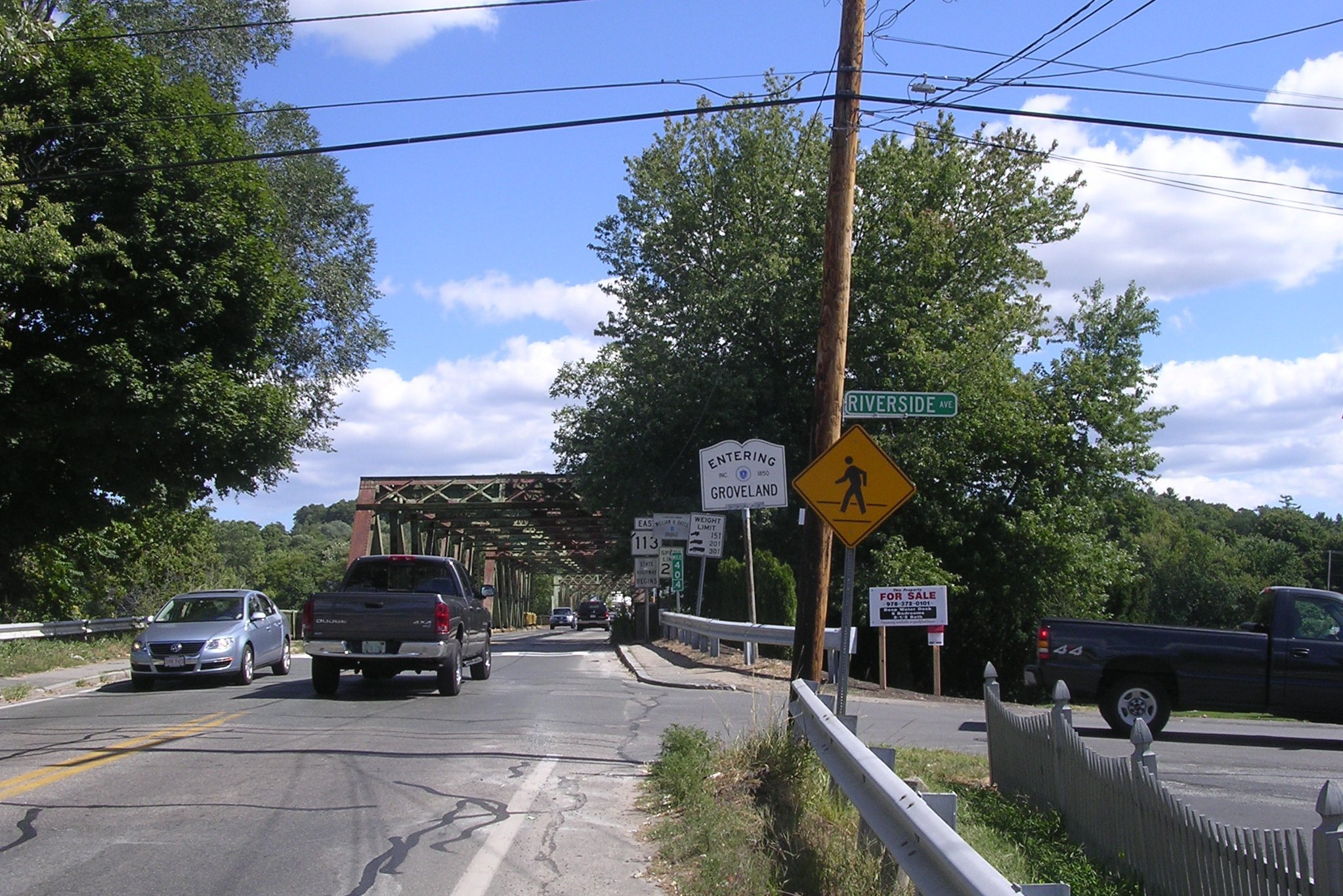
Eastbound entering Groveland along the Bates Bridge

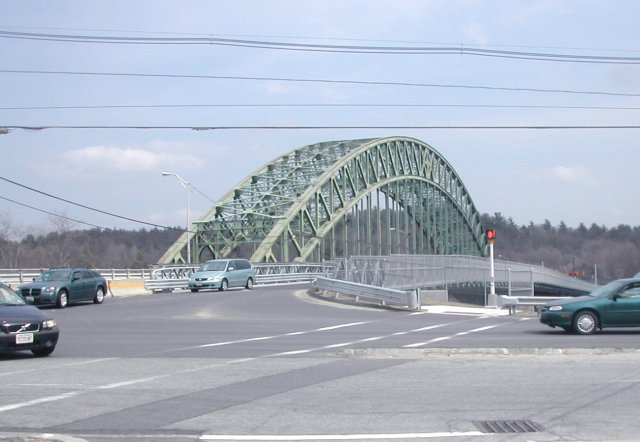
Route 113 crosses the Merrimack River on the Tyngsboro Bridge. The bridge on the right was a temporary crossing while the 1930s bridge was being rebuilt.

As Pawtucket Boulevard, Route 113 follows the Merrimack into the city of Lowell. Once in Lowell, Route 113 acts as a parkway along the north bank of the river, intersecting the Rourke Bridge and the O'Donnell Bridge near the Pawtucket Falls before splitting from the parkway, which turns into the VFW Highway. Route 113 turns northward, crossing into Dracut. It crosses the Beaver Brook before intersecting with Route 38 near the town center. From there, Route 113 continues through a rural section of Dracut into Methuen and Essex County.

In Methuen, Route 113 meets Route 110 along with Interstate 93 at a partial cloverleaf interchange that replaced the Methuen Rotary. This is Exit 43 on I-93. The two routes split shortly thereafter, with Route 113 heading into downtown Methuen. It intersects with Route 28 before continuing eastward, with two exits of Route 213 (the Loop Connector) meeting the route before and after The Loop shopping center. It then crosses that route and I-495 without junction, before meeting Route 110 again, beginning a long concurrency with that route that leads into Haverhill.

In Haverhill, Routes 113 and 110 follow the north bank of the Merrimack, and meet I-495 at Exit 107. The routes split at Emerson Street, where Route 110 turns northward. Route 113 intersects Route 125 just north of the Basiliere Bridge, which leads into the Bradford section of the city. It then joins Route 97 at Ginty Boulevard, running concurrently through the eastern end of town, passing Holy Family Hospital at Merrimack Valley, Riverside Park, and Trinity Stadium, locally known for being the site of an exhibition featuring Babe Ruth. Routes 113 and 97 then cross the Bates Bridge into Groveland, where the two split once more, with Route 113 heading northeastward along the river.

Route 113 passes through the town of West Newbury as that town's Main Street, before crossing the Artichoke River into Newburyport, just south of Maudslay State Park. In Newburyport, it crosses I-95 at Exit 86. It then continues eastward towards the downtown area, finally ending at the intersection of Route 1A with its parent route, U.S. Route 1, which is a freeway at this point.

== History ==
While Route 113's western terminus has never changed, its eastern end has. It originally ended somewhere in Tyngsborough, likely at or near US Route 3. It was extended to the Methuen area by 1933, and by 1939 it was extended to its present end, inheriting this section from Route 125.

A $24 million project to rehabilitate the Tyngsborough Bridge began in 2005. Repairs took around seven years, and the original bridge was re-opened on the morning of September 11, 2012. In late 2011, through traffic just east of the bridge was rerouted to curve away from the Merrimack River before rejoining the original right of way. However, the original route remains open for local traffic.

In 2010, a project began to replace the Bates Bridge in Haverhill/Groveland with a modern bridge. The project is expected to take two to three years and cost approximately $45 million.

== Major intersections ==
County	Location	mi	km	Destinations	Notes
Middlesex	Pepperell	0.00	0.00	Route 119 – Groton, Littleton, Townsend	Western terminus
Middlesex	Pepperell	3.1	5.0	Route 111 – Hollis, NH, Nashua, NH, Groton, Ayer	
Middlesex	Tyngsborough	11.4	18.3	US 3 – Nashua, NH, Manchester, NH, Lowell, Burlington	Exit 90 on US 3
Middlesex	Tyngsborough	12.5	20.1	Route 3A – Hudson, NH, Lowell	Short concurrency with Route 3A over the Tyngsborough Bridge
Middlesex	Lowell	18.8	30.3	VFW Highway to Route 110 – Lawrence, Haverhill	
Middlesex	Dracut	20.9	33.6	Route 38 – Lowell, Wilmington, Pelham, NH	
Essex	Methuen	27.0	43.5	I-93 / Route 110 west – Boston, Concord, NH, Lowell	Western end of Route 110 concurrency; exit 43 on I-93
Essex	Methuen	27.3	43.9	Route 110 east – Lawrence	Eastern end of Route 110 concurrency
Essex	Methuen	29.2	47.0	Route 28 – Lawrence, Andover, Salem, NH	
Essex	Methuen	30.5	49.1	Route 213 to I-495 – Haverhill, Salisbury	Route 213 exit 3 eastbound ramps only; to westbound ramps via Howe Street
Essex	Methuen	31.3	50.4	Route 213 to I-93 / I-495	Exit 4 on Route 213
Essex	Methuen	32.5	52.3	Route 110 west – Lawrence, Lowell	Western end of Route 110 concurrency
Essex	Haverhill	35.2	56.6	I-495 – Lawrence, Lowell, Amesbury, Salisbury	Exit 107 on I-495
Essex	Haverhill	37.6	60.5	Route 110 east – Merrimac, Salisbury	Eastern end of Route 110 concurrency
Essex	Haverhill	37.8	60.8	Route 125	
Essex	Haverhill	38.2	61.5	Route 97 north – Salem, NH	Western end of Route 97 concurrency
Essex	Groveland	40.5	65.2	Route 97 south – Georgetown, Topsfield	Eastern end of Route 97 concurrency
Essex	Newburyport	48.0	77.2	I-95 – Peabody, Boston, Salisbury, Portsmouth, NH	Exit 86 on I-95
Essex	Newburyport	50.53	81.32	US 1 / Route 1A – Rowley, Boston, Newbury, Ipswich, Salisbury, Portsmouth, NH	Eastern terminus
1.000 mi = 1.609 km; 1.000 km = 0.621 mi: Concurrency terminus; Incomplete access
