= Massachusetts Route 110 =

State highway in Massachusetts, United States

Route 110
- Route 110 highlighted in red

Route information
- Maintained by MassDOT
- Length: 69.24 mi (111.43 km)

Major junctions
- West end: Route 12 / Route 140 in West Boylston
- Route 62 / Route 70 in Clinton; Route 2 in Harvard; I-495 in Littleton and Amesbury; US 3 in Chelmsford; I-93 / Route 113 in Methuen; Route 28 in Lawrence; I-95 in Amesbury
- East end: US 1 / Route 1A in Salisbury

Location
- Country: United States
- State: Massachusetts
- Counties: Worcester, Middlesex, Essex

Highway system
- Massachusetts State Highway System; Interstate; US; State
← Route 109	→ Route 111

Route 110 is a 69.24-mile-long (111.43 km) southwest–northeast state route in the U.S. state of Massachusetts. Route 110's western terminus is at a concurrency of Route 12 and Route 140 in West Boylston, and its eastern terminus is at the junction of U.S. Route 1 (US 1) and Route 1A in Salisbury, a few miles from the Atlantic Ocean. Route 110 provides an alternate route for the northern part (north of Route 2) of Interstate 495 (I-495).

== Route description ==
Route 110 begins at Route 12 and Route 140 in West Boylston, just north of the Wachusett Reservoir and the border with Worcester. The route follows north of the reservoir, passing through Sterling before entering Clinton. In Clinton, Route 110 shares a quarter-mile concurrency with Route 62 and Route 70 before heading northward, crossing the Nashua River and passing through Lancaster.

The route continues into Bolton, crossing Route 117 and passing the Bolton Flats before entering the town of Harvard. Route 110 continues through the village of Still River, wrapping around Bare Hill Pond before joining Route 111, starting a 3.7-mile long concurrency which crosses Route 2 at Exit 109, just east of Fort Devens. The concurrency with Route 111 ends in Ayer in Middlesex County at a rotary junction with Route 2A, where Route 110 begins a concurrency with Route 2A eastward into Littleton.

In Littleton, Routes 110 and 2A cross the Fitchburg Line railroad tracks before meeting I-495 at Exit 79, beginning Route 110's long relationship with the interstate. At Route 119. Route 2A leaves Route 110 to head eastward, with Route 110 entering Westford. In Westford, Route 110 shares a short concurrency with Route 225 before continuing just south of I-495, accessing the highway again off of Boston Road. Route 110 enters Chelmsford, meeting Route 4 and the western end of Route 129 at the center of town, just north of the northern end of Route 27. Route 110 then crosses I-495 at Exit 88, and then shortly meets U.S. Route 3 at Exit 81C, just as Route 110 enters the city of Lowell.

In Lowell, Route 110 joins Route 3A near the Gallagher Transit Center and just north of the northern end of the Lowell Connector. Route 110 continues eastward, meeting the western end of Route 133 at Route 38, joining Route 38 to head northward across the Merrimack River via the Hunts Falls Bridge. Just north of the bridge the two routes split at a rotary, with Route 38 heading west and Route 110 heading east, following the northern bank of the Merrimack on a two-lane road through Dracut and into Methuen. Up until approximately 1997, the Methuen section was a four-lane road; its total length as a four-lane road was the same as the modern two-lane road is. The change to being a two-lane road thus was most likely due to safety.

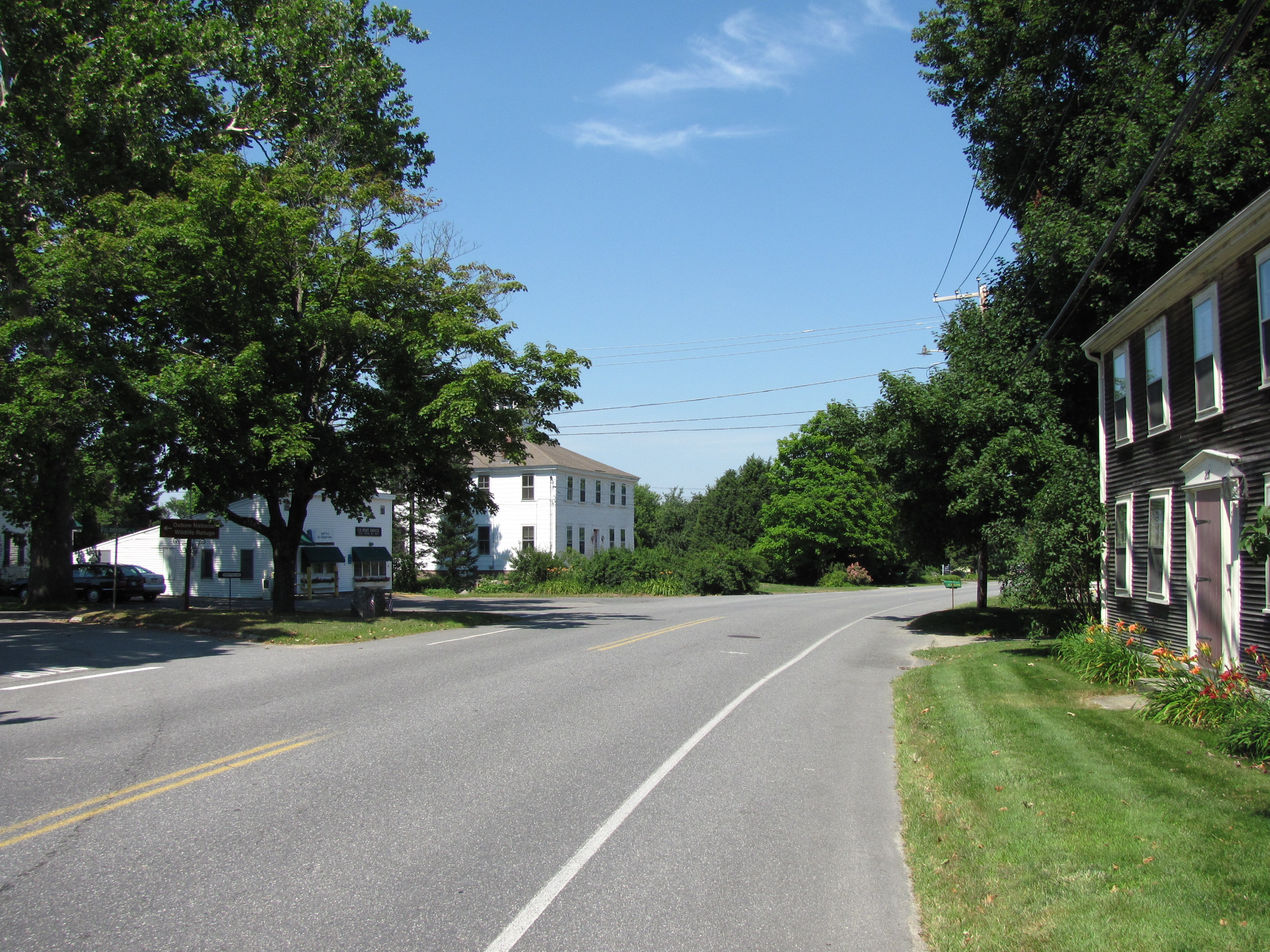
Northbound in Still River

In Methuen, Route 110 meets Route 113 at an interchange with Interstate 93 at Exit 43, splitting from Route 113 quickly, with Route 110 heading eastward into the city of Lawrence. Route 110 crosses Route 28 before heading along the north side of Campagnone Common before turning northward along Jackson Street. It then heads back into Methuen and turns eastward again along Swan Street, heading towards another junction with I-495 at Exit 104. The route then junctions Route 113 again before crossing under I-495 without junction before entering Haverhill.

In Haverhill, Routes 110 and 113 bend around the Merrimack, meeting I-495 again at Exit 107. The routes follow the banks of the Merrimack until Route 110 turns northward along Emerson Street. It crosses Route 97 before having a brief concurrency with Route 125, turning northward. The route passes Winnekenni Park and Kenoza Lake at the junction with Route 108 before crossing I-495 again at Exit 111. Route 110 then heads into Merrimac, acting as the main street through that town before entering Amesbury. In Amesbury, Route 110 junctions Route 150 and I-495 at its last exit (Exit 119) before crossing I-95 at exit 88 and entering Salisbury. Between these two interstates, Route 110 carries the traffic from one to the other as there is no direct access from 495 north to 95 south or 95 north to 495 south. The route finally ends at U.S. Route 1 (known locally as Bridge Road) just south of where Route 1A leaves it for the last time, 2.5 miles (4.0 km) west of Salisbury Beach and the Atlantic Ocean.

== Major intersections ==
County	Location	mi	km	Destinations	Notes
Worcester	West Boylston	0.00	0.00	Route 12 / Route 140 to I-290 – Sterling, Worcester, Boylston	Western terminus
Worcester	Clinton	5.5	8.9	Route 62 east / Route 70 south – Berlin, Hudson, Boylston	Western end of Route 62/Route 70 concurrency
Worcester	Clinton	5.8	9.3	Route 62 west / Route 70 north – Sterling, Barre, Lancaster	Eastern end of Route 62/Route 70 concurrency
Worcester	Bolton	9.4	15.1	Route 117 – Bolton, Maynard, Leominster	
Worcester	Harvard	14.4	23.2	Route 111 south – Boxboro, Concord	Western end of Route 111 concurrency
Worcester	Harvard	16.0	25.7	Route 2 – Concord, Boston, Fitchburg, Greenfield	Exit 109 on Route 2; cloverleaf interchange
Middlesex	Ayer	18.1	29.1	Route 2A west / Route 111 north – Ayer, Groton	Roundabout; eastern end of Route 111 concurrency; western end of Route 2A concurrency
Middlesex	Littleton	22.6	36.4	I-495 – Marlboro, Taunton, Lowell, Lawrence	Exit 79 on I-495; partial cloverleaf interchange
Middlesex	Littleton	23.9	38.5	Route 2A east / Route 119 – Concord, Boston, Groton, Townsend	Eastern end of Route 2A concurrency
Middlesex	Westford	25.3	40.7	Route 225 west – Forge Village	Western end of Route 225 concurrency
Middlesex	Westford	25.6	41.2	Route 225 east – Carlisle	Eastern end of Route 225 concurrency
Middlesex	Westford	26.8	43.1	To I-495	Access via Boston Road
Middlesex	Chelmsford	31.2	50.2	Route 4 / Route 129 east to Route 27 – North Chelmsford, Bedford, Billerica	Brief concurrency with Route 4; western terminus of Route 129
Middlesex	Chelmsford	31.8	51.2	I-495 – Marlboro, Taunton, Lawrence, Haverhill	Exit 88 on I-495; partial cloverleaf interchange
Middlesex	Chelmsford	32.8	52.8	US 3 – Billerica, Nashua, NH	Exit 81C on US 3; partial cloverleaf interchange
Middlesex	Lowell	34.7	55.8	Route 3A – Billerica, Chelmsford, Tyngsboro	Brief concurrency with Route 3A; to Lowell Connector via Route 3A south
Middlesex	Lowell	35.7	57.5	Route 38 south / Route 133 east – Tewksbury, Andover, Gloucester	Western end of Route 38 concurrency; western terminus of Route 133
Middlesex	Lowell	36.1	58.1	Route 38 north – Dracut	Eastern end of Route 38 concurrency at rotary interchange above VFW Parkway
Essex	Methuen	43.0	69.2	I-93 / Route 113 west – Boston, Concord, NH, Dracut	Western end of concurrency with Route 113; exit 43 on I-93; partial cloverleaf interchange
Essex	Methuen	43.3	69.7	Route 113 east – Haverhill	Eastern end of concurrency with Route 113
Essex	Lawrence	45.3	72.9	Route 28 – Salem, NH, Andover	
Essex	Methuen	47.9	77.1	I-495 – Lowell, Marlboro, Haverhill, Salisbury	Exit 104 on I-495; partial cloverleaf interchange
Essex	Methuen	49.3	79.3	Route 113 west – Methuen Ctr	Western end of Route 113 concurrency
Essex	Haverhill	52.0	83.7	I-495 – Lawrence, Lowell, Amesbury, Salisbury	Exit 107 on I-495; partial cloverleaf interchange
Essex	Haverhill	54.3	87.4	Route 113 east	Eastern end of Route 113 concurrency
Essex	Haverhill	54.6	87.9	Route 97 – Groveland, Salem, NH	
Essex	Haverhill	55.0	88.5	Route 125 south – North Andover, Andover	Western end of Route 125 concurrency
Essex	Haverhill	55.1	88.7	Route 125 north – Plaistow, NH, Atkinson, NH	Eastern end of Route 125 concurrency
Essex	Haverhill	56.0	90.1	Route 108 north – Newton, NH, Exeter, NH	Southern terminus of Route 108
Essex	Haverhill	57.0	91.7	I-495 – Lawrence, Lowell, Amesbury, Salisbury	Exit 111 on I-495; partial cloverleaf interchange
Essex	Amesbury	64.1	103.2	Route 150 to I-495 – Downtown Amesbury	
Essex	Amesbury	65.0	104.6	I-495 south – Haverhill, Lawrence	Westbound exit and eastbound entrance; exit 119 on I-495
Essex	Amesbury	65.9	106.1	I-95 – Peabody, Boston, Portsmouth, NH, Portland, ME	Exit 88 on I-95; partial cloverleaf interchange
Essex	Salisbury	69.24	111.43	US 1 / Route 1A – Newburyport, Salisbury Beach	Eastern terminus of Route 110
1.000 mi = 1.609 km; 1.000 km = 0.621 mi: Concurrency terminus; Incomplete access

== Massachusetts Route 110A ==
Route 110A
- Location: Amesbury-Salisbury

Route 110A was a short north–south state highway running from Amesbury to Salisbury. Its only record is a 1936 map of the area.
