= West Concord =

West Concord is the name of some places in the United States:

- West Concord, Massachusetts
  - West Concord station, a commuter rail station
- West Concord, Minnesota

== See also ==
- Concord West, New South Wales, Australia
