= Middlesex County, Massachusetts =

County in Massachusetts, United States

- County
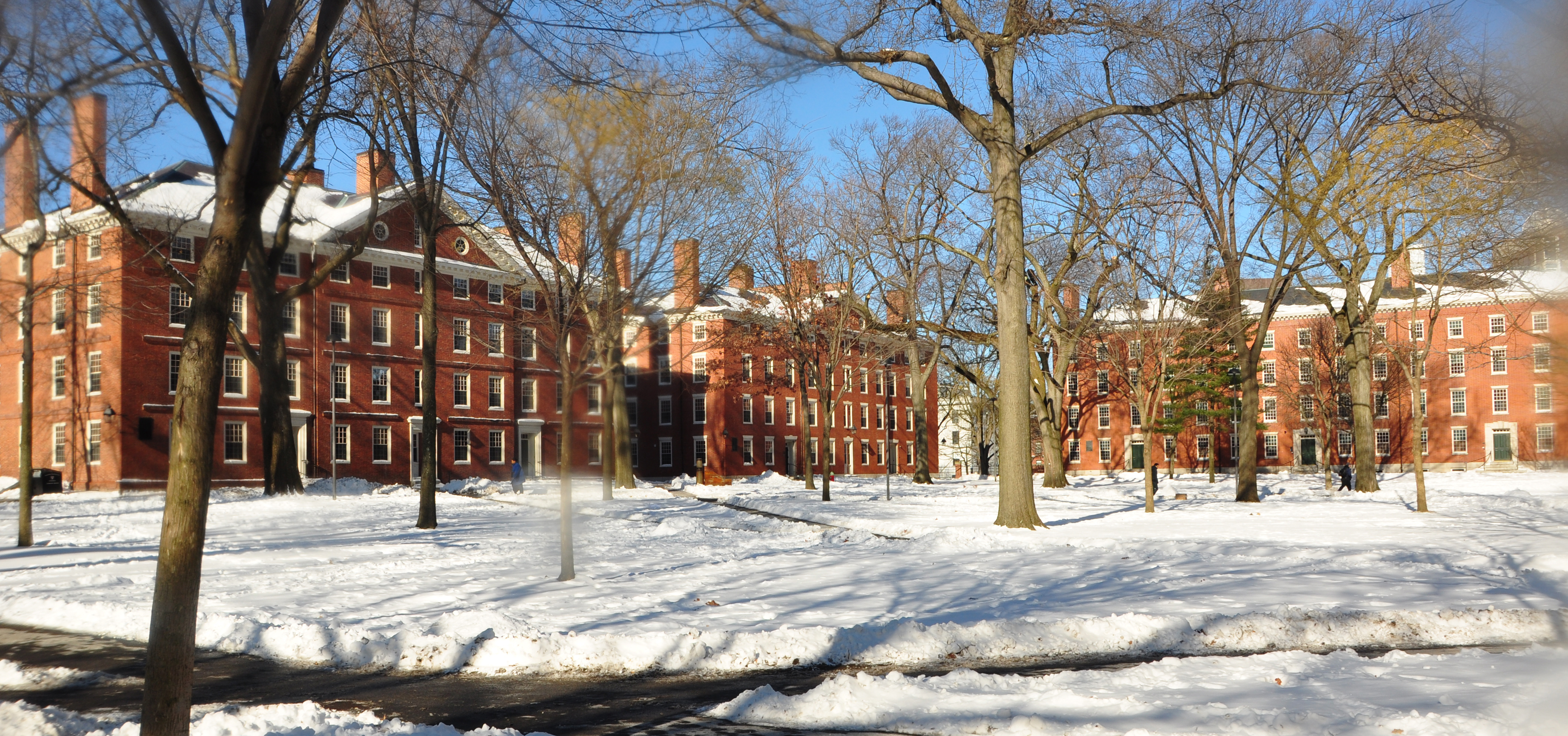
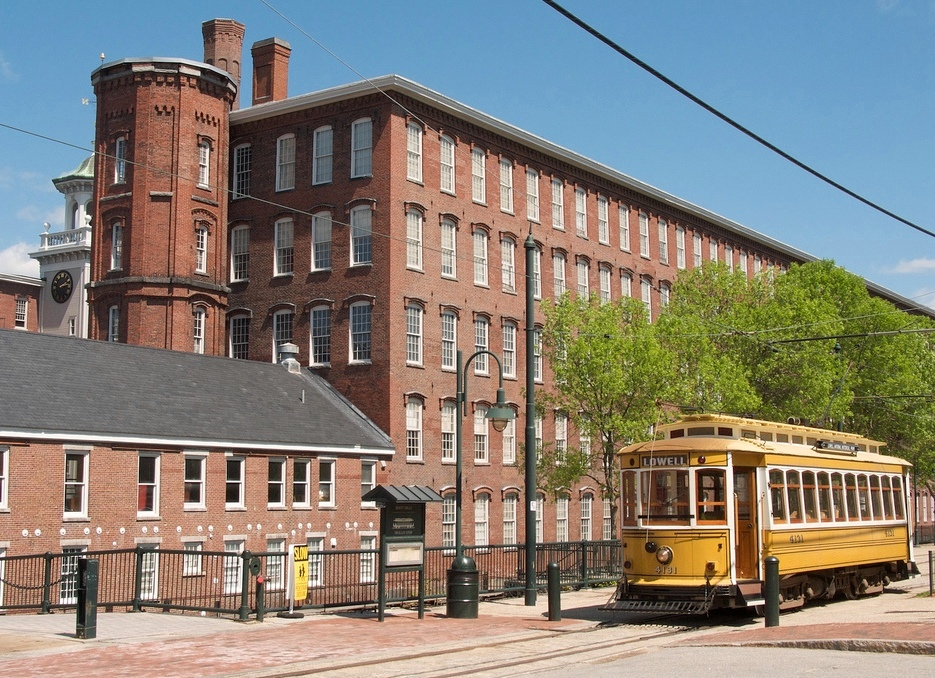
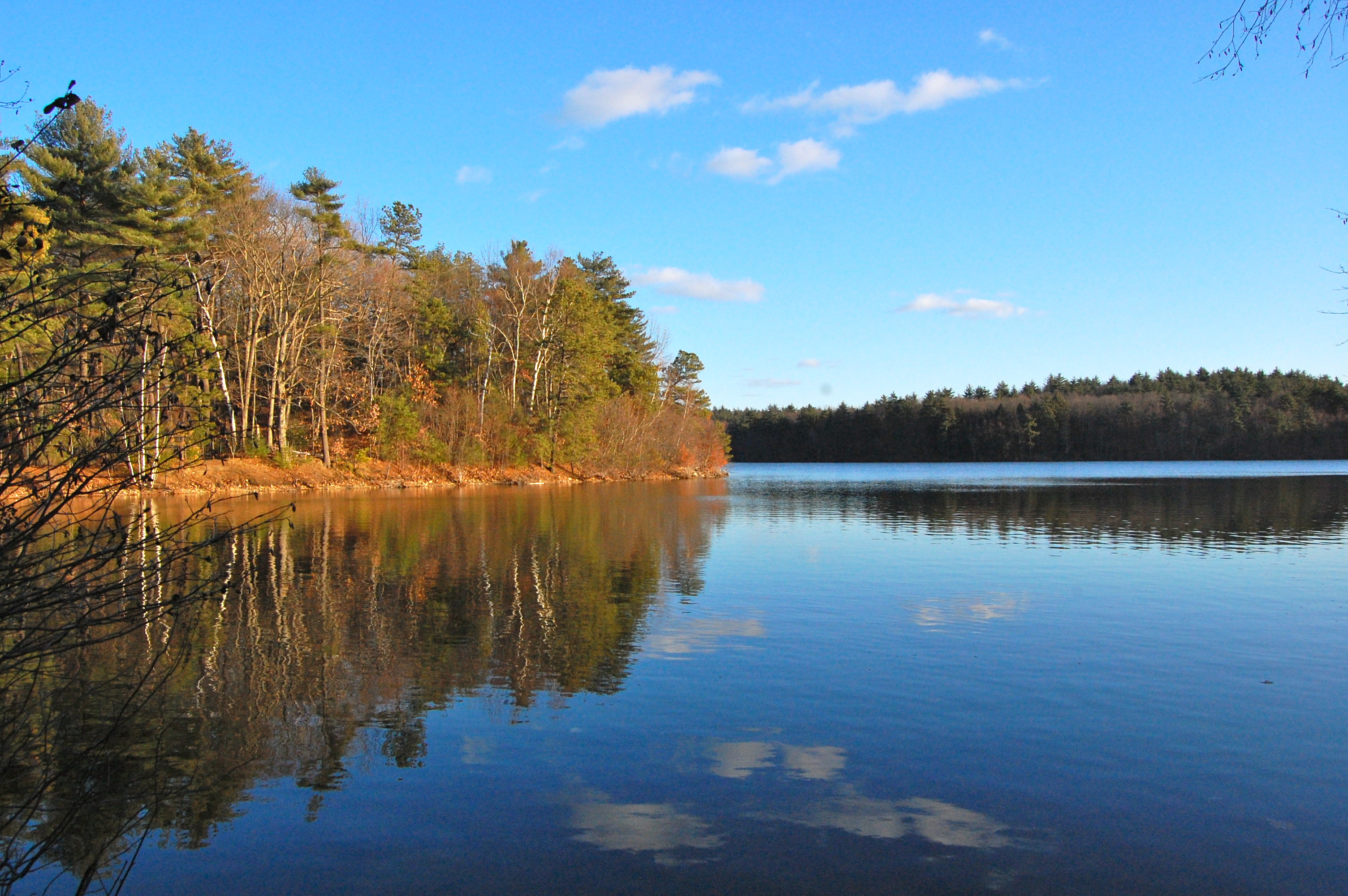
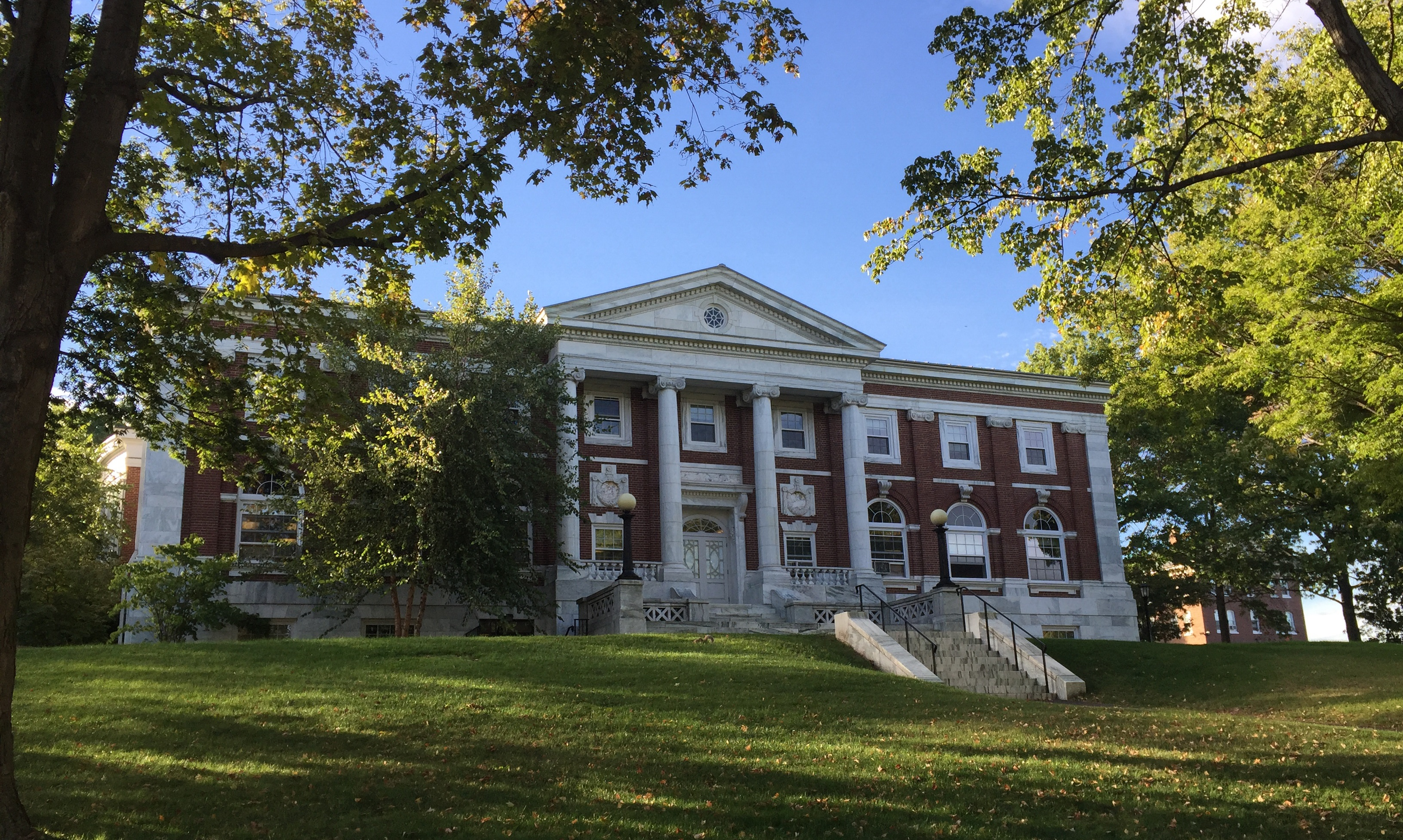
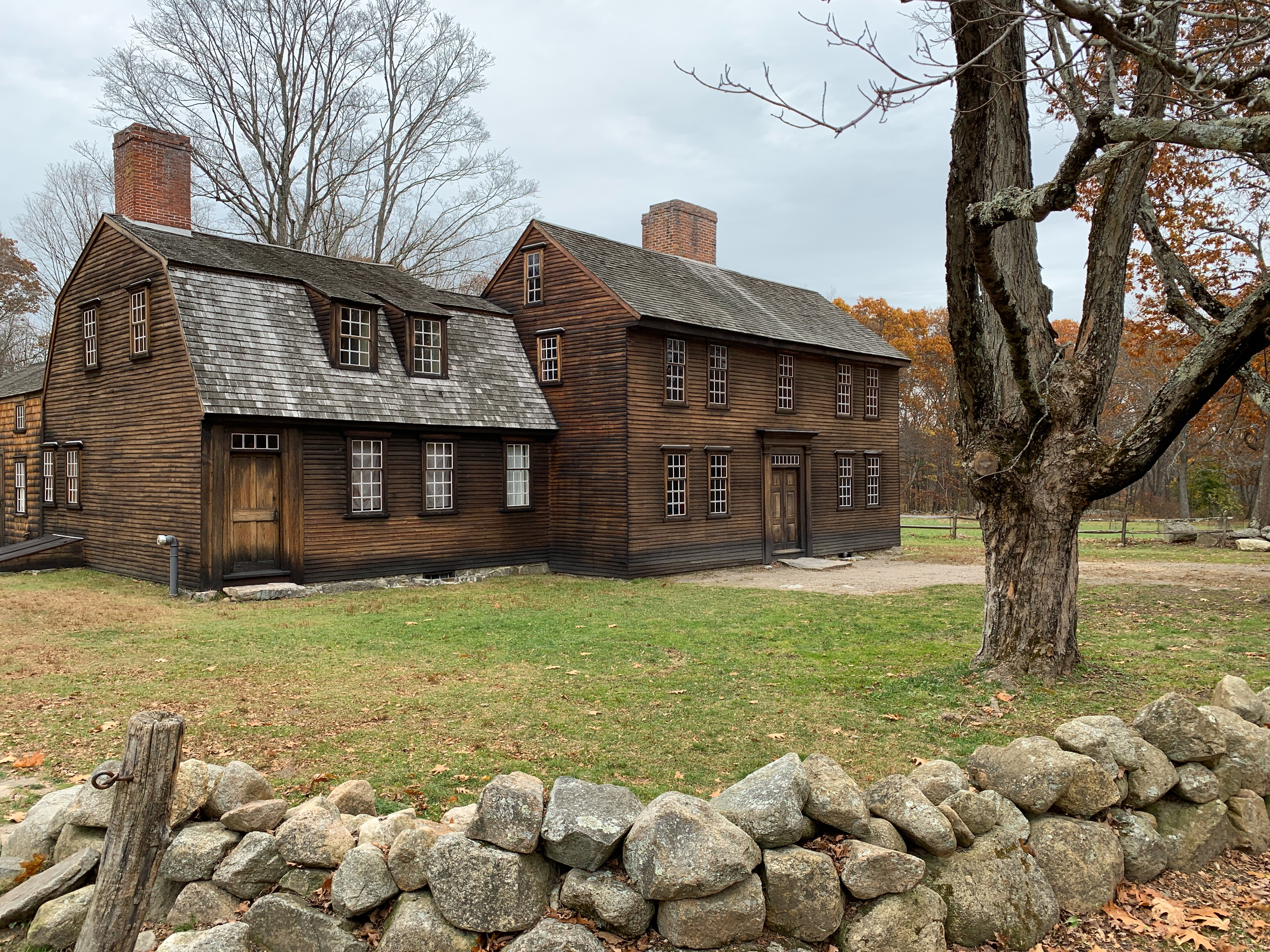
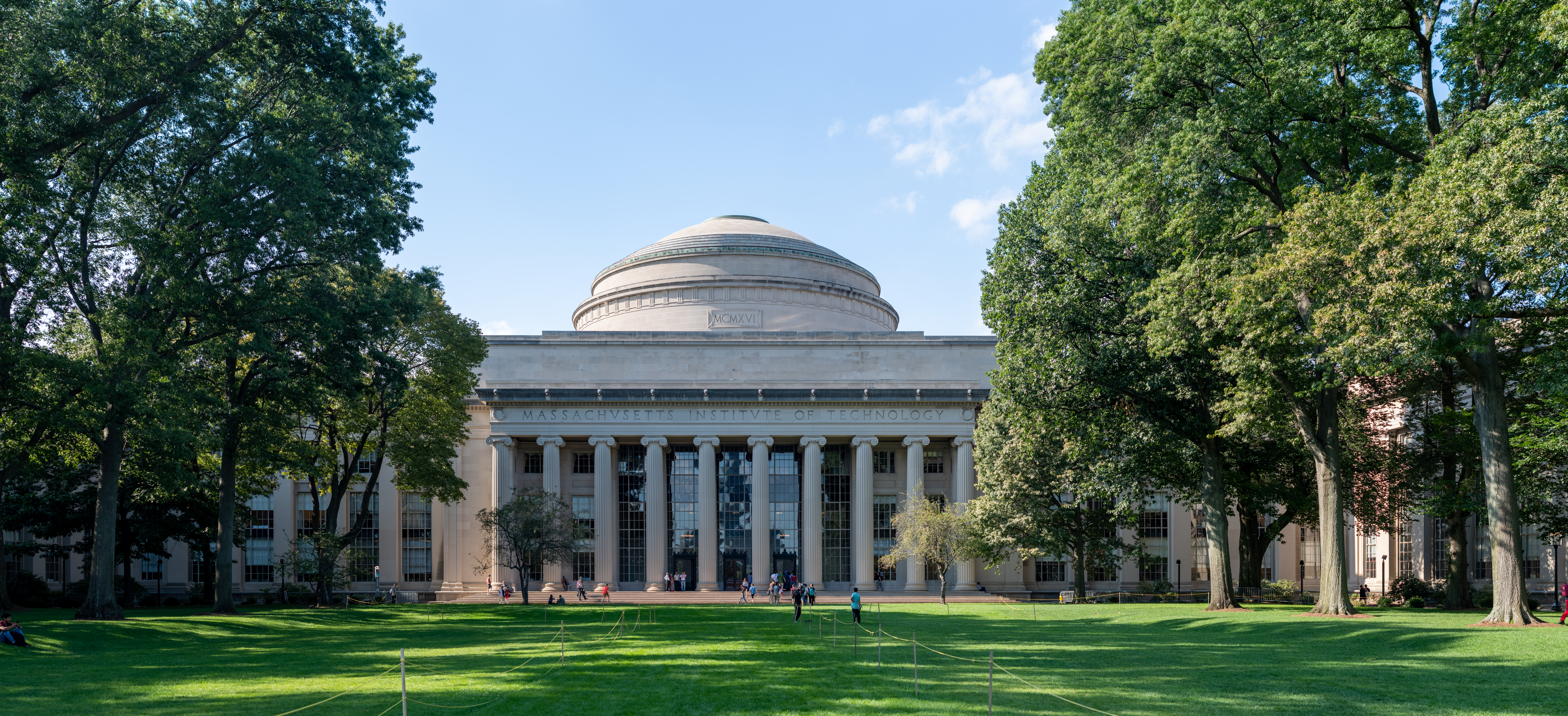
- Harvard University Lowell Mills Walden Pond Tufts University Hartwell Tavern Massachusetts Institute of Technology

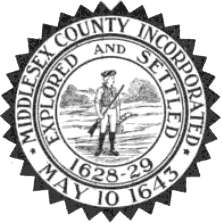
- Seal

- Location within the U.S. state of Massachusetts
- Coordinates: 42.49°N 71.39°W
- Country: United States
- State: Massachusetts
- Founded: May 10, 1643
- Named for: Middlesex, England
- Seat: Lowell and Cambridge
- Largest city: Cambridge

Area
  - Total: 847 sq mi (2,190 km^{2})
  - Land: 818 sq mi (2,120 km^{2})
  - Water: 29 sq mi (75 km^{2}) 3.5%

Population (2020)
  - Total: 1,632,002
  - Estimate (2025): 1,669,979 ▲
  - Density: 2,000/sq mi (770/km^{2})

GDP
  - Total: $240.665 billion (2024)
- Time zone: UTC−5 (Eastern)
  - Summer (DST): UTC−4 (EDT)
- Congressional districts: 2nd, 3rd, 4th, 5th, 6th, 7th

Middlesex County is a county located in the Commonwealth of Massachusetts, United States, one of fourteen in the state. As of the 2020 census, the population was 1,632,002, making it the most populous county in both Massachusetts and New England and the 20th most populous county in the United States. This makes the county the most populous county on the East Coast outside of New York or Florida. Middlesex County is one of two U.S. counties (along with Santa Clara County, California) to be amongst the top 25 counties with the highest household income and the 25 most populated counties. It is included in the Census Bureau's Boston–Cambridge–Newton, MA–NH Metropolitan Statistical Area. As part of the 2020 United States census, the Commonwealth's mean center of population for that year was geo-centered in Middlesex County, in the town of Natick (Note: That center was at 42.273659°N 71.350366°W.) (this is not to be confused with the geographic center of Massachusetts, which is in Rutland, Worcester County).

On July 11, 1997, Massachusetts abolished the executive government of Middlesex County primarily due to the county's insolvency. Middlesex County continues to exist as a geographic boundary and is used primarily as district jurisdictions within the court system and for other administrative purposes; for example, as an election district. The National Weather Service weather alerts (such as severe thunderstorm warnings) continue to localize based on Massachusetts's counties.

== History ==
The county was created by the Massachusetts General Court on May 10, 1643, when it was ordered that "the whole plantation within this jurisdiction be divided into four shires." Middlesex initially contained Charlestown, Cambridge, Watertown, Sudbury, Concord, Woburn, Medford, and Reading. In 1649 the first Middlesex County Registry of Deeds was created in Cambridge.

On April 19, 1775, Middlesex was the site of the first armed conflict of the American Revolutionary War.

In 1855, the Massachusetts State Legislature created a minor Registry of Deeds for the Northern District of Middlesex County in Lowell.

In the late 19th century and early 20th century, Boston annexed several of its adjacent cities and towns including Charlestown and Brighton from Middlesex County, resulting in an enlargement and accretion toward Suffolk County.

Beginning prior to the dissolution of the executive county government, the county comprised two regions with separate county seats for administrative purposes:

- The Middlesex-North District (smaller) with its county seat in Lowell under the Registry of Deeds consisted of the city of Lowell, and its adjacent towns of Billerica, Carlisle, Chelmsford, Dracut, Dunstable, Tewksbury, Tyngsborough, Westford and Wilmington.
- The Middlesex-South District (larger) with the county seat in Cambridge consisted of the remaining 44 cities and towns of Middlesex County.

Since the start of the 21st century, much of the current and former county offices have physically decentralized from the Cambridge seat, with the sole exceptions being the Registry of Deeds and the Middlesex Probate and Family Court, which both retain locations in Cambridge and Lowell. Since the first quarter of 2008, the Superior Courthouse has been seated in the city of Woburn; the Sheriff's Office is now administratively seated in the city of Medford and the Cambridge-based County Jail has since been amalgamated with another county jail facility in Billerica. The Cambridge District Court (which has jurisdiction for Arlington, Belmont and Cambridge); along with the Middlesex County District Attorney's Office, although not a part of the Middlesex County government, was also relatedly forced to relocate to Medford at the time of the closure of the Superior Courthouse building in Cambridge.

== Government and politics ==
Of the fourteen counties of Massachusetts, Middlesex is one of eight which have had no county government or county commissioners since July 1, 1998, when county functions were assumed by state agencies at local option following a change in state law. Immediately prior to its dissolution, the executive branch consisted of three County Commissioners elected at-large to staggered four-year terms. There was a County Treasurer elected to a six-year term. The county derived its revenue primarily from document filing fees at the Registries of Deeds and from a Deeds Excise Tax; also a transfer tax was assessed on the sale price of real estate and collected by the Registries of Deeds.

Budgets as proposed by the County Commissioners were approved by a County Advisory Board that consisted of a single representative of each of the 54 cities and towns in Middlesex County. The votes of the individual members of the advisory board were weighted based on the overall valuation of property in their respective communities.

The County Sheriff and two Registers of Deeds (one for the Northern District at Lowell and another for the Southern District at Cambridge) are each elected to serve six-year terms. Besides the employees of the Sheriff's Office and the two Registries of Deeds, the county had a Maintenance Department, a Security Department, some administrative staff in the Treasurer's and Commissioners' Offices, and the employees of the hospital.

The county government also owned and operated the Superior Courthouse, one of which was formerly in Cambridge (since 2008 relocated to Woburn.) and one in Lowell; and the defunct Middlesex County Hospital in the city of Waltham.

The legislation abolishing the Middlesex County executive retained the Sheriff and Registers of Deeds as independently elected officials, and transferred the Sheriff's Office under the state Department of Public Safety and the two Registry of Deeds offices to the Massachusetts Secretary of State's Office. Additionally, all county maintenance and security employees were absorbed into the corresponding staffs of the Massachusetts Trial Court. The legislation also transferred ownership of the two Superior Courthouses to the Commonwealth of Massachusetts. The hospital was closed. Finally, the office of County Commissioner was immediately abolished and the office of County Treasurer was abolished as of December 31, 2002. Any county roads transferred to the Commonwealth as part of the dissolution. The other administrative duties (such as Sheriff, Department of Deeds and court system, etc.) and all supporting staff were transferred under the Commonwealth as well.

District attorneys of Middlesex County
District attorney	Term
Samuel Dana	1807–1811
Timothy Fuller	1811–1812
Asahel Stearns	1813–1832
Asahel Huntington	1832–1845
Albert H. Nelson	1845–1848
Charles R. Train	1848–1851
Asa W. Farr	1851–1853
Charles R. Train	1853–1855
Isaac S. Morse	1855–1872
John B. Goodrich	1872–1874
George Stevens	1874–1879
John Wilkes Hammond	1879–1880
William Burnham Stevens	1880–1890
Patrick H. Cooney	1890–1893
Fred N. Wier	1893–1902
George A. Sanderson	1902–1907
Hugh Bancroft	1907–1908
John J. Higgins	1908–1913
William J. Corcoran	1913–1917
Nathan A. Tufts	1917–1921
Endicott Peabody Saltonstall	1921–1922
Arthur Kenneth Reading	1922–1927
Robert T. Bushnell	1927–1931
Warren L. Bishop	1931–1938
William G. Andrew	1938–1939
Robert F. Bradford	1939–1945
George E. Thompson	1945–1956
Ephraim Martin	1956–1957
James O'Dea Jr.	1957–1959
John J. Droney	1959–1983
Scott Harshbarger	1983–1991
Thomas Reilly	1991–1999
Martha Coakley	1999–2007
Gerard Leone	2007–2013
Marian T. Ryan	2013–present

Sheriffs of Middlesex County
Sheriff	Term
Capt. Timothy Phillips	1692–1702
Capt. Samuel Gookin	1702–1714
Col. Edmund Goffe	1714–1717
Samuel Gookin^{(2nd term)}	1717–1729
Daniel Foster	1729–1731
Richard Foster, Jr.	1731–1764
Col. David Phips	1764–1775
Col. James Prescott	1775–1781
Col. Loammi Baldwin	1781–1794
Maj. Joseph Hosmer	1794–1808
Gen. William Hildreth, Jr.	1808–1813
Gen. Nathaniel Austin, Jr.	1813–1831
Benjamin Franklin Varnum	1831–1841
Col. Samuel Chandler	1841–1851
Fisher Ames Hildreth	1851–1853
John Sheppard Keyes	1853–1859
Charles Kimball	1859–1879
Eben Winslow Fiske	1879–1883
Henry Greenwood Cushing	1883–1899
John Robert Fairbain	1899–1934
Joseph M. McElroy	1934–1947
Loring R. Kew	1947-1947
Louis E. Boutwell	1948–1949
Howard W. Fitzpatrick	1949–1970
John J. Buckley	1970–1980
Edward Henneberry	1980–1984
William Quealy (acting)	1984–1985
John P. McGonigle	1985–1994
Robert C. Krekorian (acting)	1994
Anthony M. Sasso (acting)	1994
R. Bradford Bailey	1994–1996
James DiPaola	1996–2010
John Granara (Special)	2010–2011
Peter Koutoujian	2011–Present

=== Administrative structure today ===
Records of land ownership in Middlesex County continue to be maintained at the two Registries of Deeds. Besides the Sheriff and the two Registers of Deeds, the Middlesex District Attorney, the Middlesex Register of Probate and the Middlesex Clerk of Courts (which were already part of state government before the abolition of Middlesex County government) are all elected countywide to six-year terms.

In Middlesex County (as in the entirety of the Commonwealth of Massachusetts), the governmental functions such as property tax assessment and collection, public education, road repair and maintenance, and elections were all conducted at the municipal city and town level and not by the county government.

In 2012 the 22-story Superior Court Building in Cambridge which was transferred from the abolished Executive County government was sold by the Commonwealth of Massachusetts. Due to its transfer from state control, many local residents had tried to force the private developers to reduce the overall height of the structure.

Even following the abolition of the executive branch for county government in Middlesex, communities are still granted a right by the Massachusetts state legislature to form their own regional compacts for sharing of services and costs thereof.

County government: Middlesex County
Clerk of Courts:	Michael A. Sullivan
District Attorney:	Marian T. Ryan
Register of Deeds:	Richard P. Howe, Jr. (North at Lowell); Maria C. Curtatone (South at Cambridge)
Register of Probate:	Tara E. DeCristofaro
County Sheriff:	Peter J. Koutoujian
State government
State Representative(s):	37 Representatives
State Senator(s):	16 Senators
Governor's Councilor(s):	Robert L. Jubinville (D-2nd district); Marilyn M. Petitto (D-3rd district); Eileen R. Duff (D-5th district); Terrence W. Kennedy (D-6th district); Paul DePalo (D-7th district)
Federal government
U.S. Representative(s):	Jake Auchincloss (D-4th district); Lori Trahan (D-3rd district); Seth Moulton (D-6th district); Katherine Clark (D-5th district); Ayanna Pressley (D-7th district)
U.S. Senators:	Elizabeth Warren (D), Ed Markey (D)

== Geography ==
According to the U.S. Census Bureau, the county has a total area of 847 square miles (2,190 km^{2}), of which 818 square miles (2,120 km^{2}) is land and 29 square miles (75 km^{2}) (3.5%) is water. It is the third-largest county in Massachusetts by land area.

It is bounded southeast by the Charles River and drained by the Merrimack, Nashua, and Concord rivers, and other streams.

The MetroWest region comprises much of the southern portion of the county.

=== Adjacent counties ===
- Hillsborough County, New Hampshire (north)
- Essex County (northeast)
- Suffolk County (southeast)
- Norfolk County (south)
- Worcester County (west)

=== Transportation ===
- I-90 / Mass Pike
- I-93
- I-95 / Route 128
- I-290
- I-495
- US 1
- US 3 / Route 3
  - Route 3A
- US 20
- Route 2
  - Route 2A
- Route 4
- Route 9
- Route 13
- Route 16
- Route 27
- Route 28
- Route 30
- Route 31
- Route 38
- Route 40
- Route 60
- Route 62
- Route 85
- Route 99
- Route 110
- Route 111
- Route 113
- Route 115
- Route 117
- Route 119
- Route 125
- Route 126
- Route 129
- Route 133
- Route 135
- Route 225

=== National protected areas ===
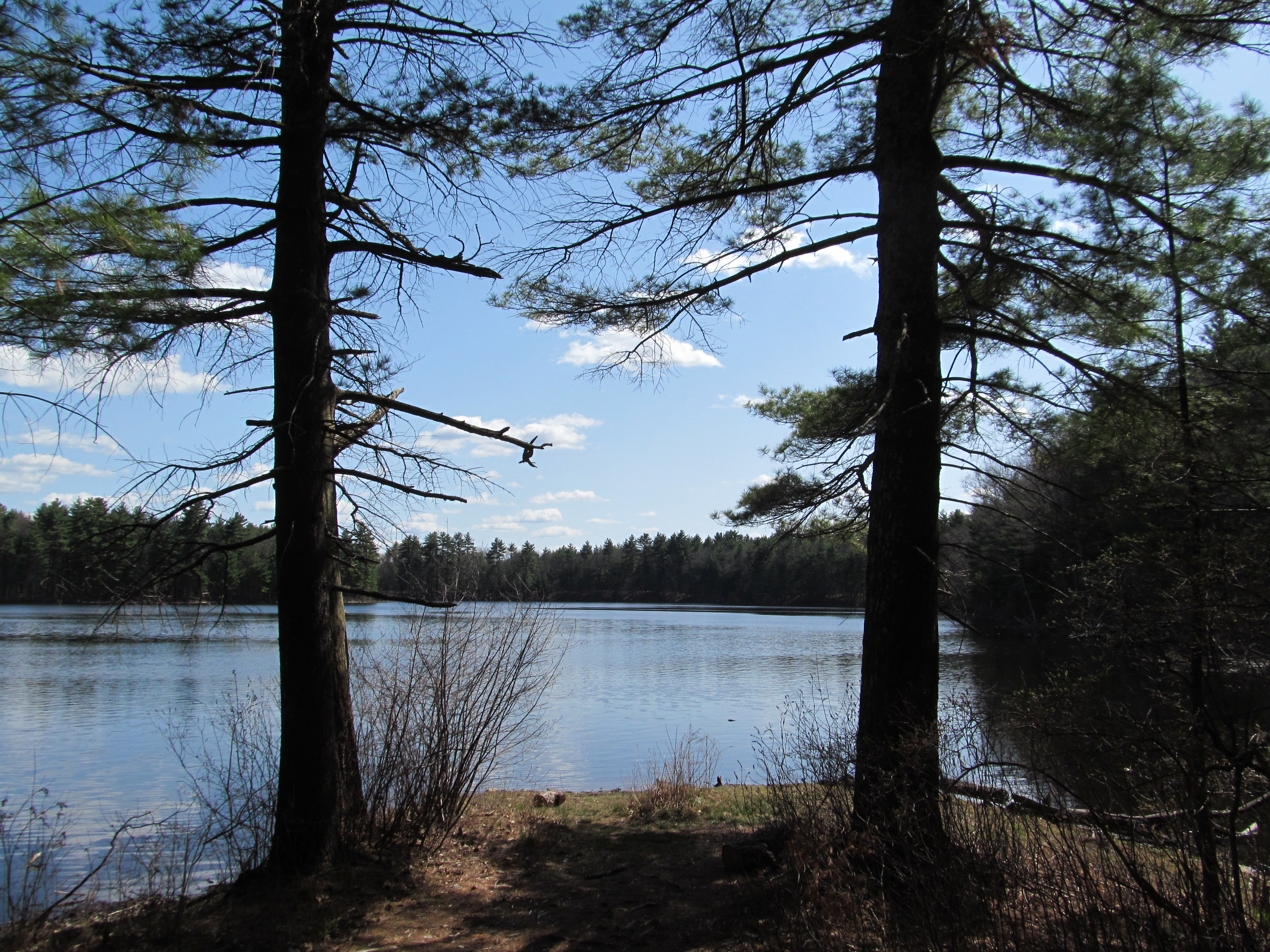
Assabet River National Wildlife Refuge, a 2,230-acre (9.0 km^{2}) protected National Wildlife Refuge approximately 25 miles (40 km) west of Boston

- Assabet River National Wildlife Refuge
- Great Meadows National Wildlife Refuge
- Longfellow House–Washington's Headquarters National Historic Site
- Lowell National Historical Park
- Minute Man National Historical Park
- Oxbow National Wildlife Refuge (part)

== Demographics ==
Historical population
Census	Pop.	Note	%±
1790	42,769		—
1800	46,928		9.7%
1810	52,789		12.5%
1820	61,472		16.4%
1830	77,961		26.8%
1840	106,611		36.7%
1850	161,383		51.4%
1860	216,354		34.1%
1870	274,353		26.8%
1880	317,830		15.8%
1890	431,167		35.7%
1900	565,696		31.2%
1910	669,915		18.4%
1920	778,352		16.2%
1930	934,924		20.1%
1940	971,390		3.9%
1950	1,064,569		9.6%
1960	1,238,742		16.4%
1970	1,397,268		12.8%
1980	1,367,034		−2.2%
1990	1,398,468		2.3%
2000	1,465,396		4.8%
2010	1,503,085		2.6%
2020	1,632,002		8.6%
2025 (est.)	1,669,979	▲	2.3%
U.S. Decennial Census; 1790-1960 1900-1990; 1990-2000 2010-2020

=== 2020 census ===
As of the 2020 census, the county had a population of 1,632,002. Of the residents, 19.5% were under the age of 18 and 16.1% were 65 years of age or older; the median age was 38.6 years.

For every 100 females there were 95.6 males, and for every 100 females age 18 and over there were 93.5 males. 96.5% of residents lived in urban areas and 3.5% lived in rural areas.

The racial makeup of the county was 68.2% White, 5.2% Black or African American, 0.2% American Indian and Alaska Native, 12.9% Asian, 0.0% Native Hawaiian and Pacific Islander, 5.2% from some other race, and 8.3% from two or more races. Hispanic or Latino residents of any race comprised 8.8% of the population.

There were 625,916 households in the county, of which 29.1% had children under the age of 18 living with them and 26.8% had a female householder with no spouse or partner present. About 26.9% of all households were made up of individuals and 11.2% had someone living alone who was 65 years of age or older.

There were 658,283 housing units, of which 4.9% were vacant. Among occupied housing units, 59.6% were owner-occupied and 40.4% were renter-occupied. The homeowner vacancy rate was 0.7% and the rental vacancy rate was 4.9%.

In 2006, Middlesex County contained the tenth most millionaires of any county in the United States.

=== Racial and ethnic composition ===
Middlesex County, Massachusetts – Racial and ethnic composition Note: the US Census treats Hispanic/Latino as an ethnic category. This table excludes Latinos from the racial categories and assigns them to a separate category. Hispanics/Latinos may be of any race.
Race / Ethnicity (NH = Non-Hispanic)	Pop 1980	Pop 1990	Pop 2000	Pop 2010	Pop 2020	% 1980	% 1990	% 2000	% 2010	% 2020
White alone (NH)	1,296,950	1,258,602	1,224,771	1,150,251	1,085,919	94.87%	90.00%	83.58%	76.53%	66.54%
Black or African American alone (NH)	24,512	37,677	46,598	65,733	80,996	1.79%	2.69%	3.18%	4.37%	4.96%
Native American or Alaska Native alone (NH)	1,255	1,709	1,692	1,578	1,414	0.09%	0.12%	0.12%	0.10%	0.09%
Asian alone (NH)	16,035	51,113	91,368	139,325	209,632	1.17%	3.65%	6.24%	9.27%	12.85%
Native Hawaiian or Pacific Islander alone (NH)	x	x	389	331	353	x	x	0.03%	0.02%	0.02%
Other race alone (NH)	4,745	1,984	6,821	16,762	28,194	0.35%	0.14%	0.47%	1.12%	1.73%
Mixed race or Multiracial (NH)	x	x	27,050	30,755	82,249	x	x	1.85%	2.05%	5.04%
Hispanic or Latino (any race)	23,537	47,383	66,707	98,350	143,245	1.72%	3.39%	4.55%	6.54%	8.78%
Total	1,367,034	1,398,468	1,465,396	1,503,085	1,632,002	100.00%	100.00%	100.00%	100.00%	100.00%

=== American Community Survey 2025 data ===
The United States Census Bureau estimated that in 2025, Middlesex County’s population was 1.669.979. It was also estimated that the county's population was 65,54% Non-Hispanic White, 10,11% Hispanic or Latino, 5,69% Non-Hispanic Black, 15,31% Asian, 0,12% Native American, 0,03% Pacific Islander, and 3,20% Multiracial.

Total	Population	Percentage
Non-Hispanic White	1.094.571	65,54%
Hispanic or Latino	168.756	10,11%
Non-Hispanic Black	95.009	5,69%
Asian	255.708	15,31%
Native American	1.948	0,12%
Pacific Islander	501	0,03%
Non-Hispanic Multiracial	53.486	3,20%

=== 2010 census ===
As of the 2010 United States census, there were 1,503,085 people, 580,688 households, and 366,656 families residing in the county. The population density was 1,837.9 inhabitants per square mile (709.6/km^{2}). There were 612,004 housing units at an average density of 748.3 per square mile (288.9/km^{2}). The racial makeup of the county was 80.0% white, 9.3% Asian, 4.7% black or African American, 0.2% American Indian, 3.3% from other races, and 2.5% from two or more races. Those of Hispanic or Latino origin made up 6.5% of the population.

The largest ancestry groups were:

- 23.5% Irish
- 16.2% Italian
- 11.2% English
- 7.1% German
- 5.6% French
- 4.0% Polish
- 3.6% French Canadian
- 3.2% Chinese
- 3.1% Portuguese
- 2.9% American
- 2.7% Scottish
- 2.6% Russian
- 2.5% Indian
- 2.4% Brazilian
- 2.0% Scotch-Irish
- 2.0% Puerto Rican
- 1.7% Swedish
- 1.6% Greek
- 1.2% Sub-Saharan African
- 1.2% Haitian
- 1.2% Armenian
- 1.1% Canadian
- 1.0% Cambodian
- 1.0% Arab

Of the 580,688 households, 31.0% had children under the age of 18 living with them, 49.5% were married couples living together, 10.1% had a female householder with no husband present, 36.9% were non-families, and 27.8% of all households were made up of individuals. The average household size was 2.49 and the average family size was 3.10. The median age was 38.5 years.

The median income for a household in the county was $77,377 and the median income for a family was $97,382. Males had a median income of $64,722 versus $50,538 for females. The per capita income for the county was $40,139. About 5.1% of families and 7.6% of the population were below the poverty line, including 8.0% of those under age 18 and 8.0% of those age 65 or over.

79.6% spoke only English at home, while 4.3% spoke Spanish, 2.7% Portuguese, 1.6% Italian, 1.6% Chinese including Mandarin and other Chinese dialects, and 1.5% spoke French.

Middlesex County has the largest Irish-American population of any U.S. county with a plurality of Irish ancestry.

=== Demographic breakdown by town ===
==== Income ====
The ranking of unincorporated communities that are included on the list is reflective if the census-designated locations and villages were included as cities or towns. Data is from the 2007-2011 American Community Survey 5-Year Estimates.

Rank	Town		Per capita income	Median household income	Median family income	Population	Number of households
1	Weston	Town	$96,475	$180,815	$220,441	11,229	3,557
2	Sherborn	Town	$70,983	$152,083	$183,456	4,102	1,463
3	Wayland	Town	$70,185	$125,076	$151,812	12,939	4,902
4	Carlisle	Town	$68,060	$159,063	$171,167	4,814	1,612
5	Lexington	Town	$67,584	$136,610	$158,888	31,129	11,411
6	Concord	Town	$67,374	$127,951	$156,352	17,523	6,197
7	Winchester	Town	$65,172	$127,665	$160,706	21,205	7,611
8	Sudbury	Town	$63,862	$159,713	$173,587	17,482	5,613
9	Newton	City	$60,323	$109,724	$141,944	84,583	30,735
10	Lincoln	Town	$57,471	$130,523	$141,667	6,480	2,150
11	Hopkinton	Town	$56,939	$126,350	$149,213	14,691	4,893
	Chestnut Hill (02467)	ZCTA	$55,947	$114,140	$151,375	21,952	6,237
12	Belmont	Town	$54,361	$99,529	$121,250	24,548	9,465
	Cochituate	CDP	$52,936	$107,589	$133,082	6,384	2,496
13	Boxborough	Town	$51,159	$103,918	$134,583	4,957	1,984
14	Acton	Town	$49,603	$109,491	$135,000	21,656	7,924
15	Natick	Town	$49,012	$90,046	$117,259	32,729	13,440
16	Bedford	Town	$48,899	$101,886	$128,448	13,192	4,951
17	Stow	Town	$48,448	$112,130	$132,061	6,488	2,328
	West Concord	CDP	$47,633	$103,693	$145,242	6,134	2,069
18	Holliston	Town	$47,624	$107,374	$125,236	13,512	4,918
19	Westford	Town	$47,587	$119,511	$135,000	21,716	7,308
20	Arlington	Town	$47,571	$85,059	$107,862	42,570	19,007
21	Groton	Town	$47,003	$117,903	$135,143	10,478	3,650
22	Ashland	Town	$46,626	$93,770	$116,799	16,305	6,484
23	Cambridge	City	$46,242	$69,017	$94,536	104,322	45,386
24	Reading	Town	$44,949	$99,131	$117,477	24,504	9,055
25	Chelmsford	Town	$42,535	$90,895	$110,967	33,610	13,304
26	North Reading	Town	$42,256	$104,069	$116,729	14,703	5,077
27	Dunstable	Town	$41,937	$109,205	$121,406	3,128	1,087
28	Littleton	Town	$41,815	$103,438	$114,094	8,810	3,198
	Middlesex County	County	$41,453	$79,691	$100,267	1,491,762	577,349
29	Watertown	City	$41,090	$76,718	$90,521	31,792	14,042
30	Wakefield	Town	$40,227	$85,379	$112,293	24,794	10,058
31	Burlington	Town	$40,083	$92,236	$107,339	24,207	9,177
32	Melrose	City	$39,873	$84,599	$105,893	26,864	10,963
	Groton	CDP	$39,208	$55,446	$127,708	1,077	507
	Hopkinton	CDP	$38,507	$71,536	$105,882	2,110	877
33	Tyngsborough	Town	$38,067	$101,103	$111,780	11,198	3,797
34	Stoneham	Town	$37,573	$77,476	$95,490	21,413	8,909
35	Marlborough	City	$37,314	$72,853	$94,770	38,087	15,856
36	Wilmington	Town	$37,084	$100,861	$107,436	22,116	7,200
37	Pepperell	Town	$37,081	$84,618	$102,946	11,407	4,125
38	Maynard	Town	$36,818	$77,255	$93,116	10,083	4,222
39	Tewksbury	Town	$36,509	$86,378	$103,008	28,778	10,670
40	Hudson	Town	$36,141	$76,714	$95,746	18,845	7,679
	Pepperell	CDP	$35,227	$68,500	$65,417	2,239	852
	Massachusetts	State	$35,051	$65,981	$83,371	6,512,227	2,522,409
41	Medford	City	$34,615	$72,033	$83,078	55,843	22,461
	Hudson	CDP	$33,734	$68,812	$86,216	14,797	6,129
42	Woburn	City	$33,725	$72,540	$87,924	37,831	15,357
43	Waltham	City	$33,717	$68,326	$82,233	60,209	23,520
44	Framingham	City	$33,665	$66,047	$86,977	67,844	26,167
	Pinehurst	CDP	$33,572	$95,038	$100,650	7,289	2,414
45	Billerica	Town	$33,347	$88,531	$98,371	39,930	13,859
46	Somerville	City	$32,785	$64,480	$71,518	75,566	31,476
47	Ashby	Town	$32,434	$82,614	$84,655	3,030	1,060
48	Ayer	Town	$32,179	$54,899	$78,947	7,370	3,063
	Littleton Common	CDP	$32,058	$80,352	$105,217	2,907	1,131
49	Dracut	Town	$31,533	$71,824	$88,281	29,249	11,173
50	Townsend	Town	$31,201	$76,250	$91,023	8,906	3,114
	East Pepperell	CDP	$30,475	$74,077	$79,104	2,195	811
	Ayer	CDP	$30,456	$42,055	$79,708	2,573	1,205
	United States	Country	$27,915	$52,762	$64,293	306,603,772	114,761,359
	Townsend	CDP	$27,166	$51,512	$71,023	968	453
51	Malden	City	$26,893	$52,842	$65,763	58,821	23,422
	Shirley	CDP	$24,943	$41,250	$41,838	1,330	593
52	Everett	City	$24,575	$48,319	$58,045	41,079	15,681
53	Shirley	Town	$24,427	$71,146	$78,493	7,235	2,189
54	Lowell	City	$23,600	$51,471	$57,934	105,860	39,399
	Devens	CDP	$13,933	$72,986	$73,194	1,704	113

== Law enforcement ==
Middlesex Sheriff's Office
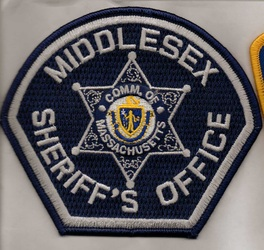
- Patch of the Middlesex Sheriff's Office
- Abbreviation: MSO

Agency overview
- Formed: 1692; 334 years ago
- Employees: 800
- Annual budget: $60 Million

Jurisdictional structure
- Operations jurisdiction: Massachusetts, U.S.
- Legal jurisdiction: County of Middlesex, Massachusetts
- General nature: Local civilian police

Operational structure
- Headquarters: Medford, Massachusetts
- Sheriff responsible: Peter Koutoujian

Facilities
- Lockups: 2
- Patrol Vehicles: Ford Crown Victoria Police Interceptor

The primary responsibility of the Middlesex Sheriff's Office is oversight of the Middlesex House of Correction and Jail in Billerica. It formerly ran the Middlesex Jail in Cambridge, which closed on June 28, 2014. In addition, the Sheriff's Office operates the Office of Civil Process and, the Lowell Community Counseling Centers, and crime prevention and community service programs. The office of sheriff was created in 1692, making it one of the oldest law enforcement agencies in the United States. The sheriff is elected to a 6-year term.

Notable sheriffs include:

- Col. James Prescott (1775–1781)
- Col. Loammi Baldwin (1781–1794)
- Col. Samuel Chandler (1841–1851)
- Charles Kimball (1859–1879)
- John J. Buckley (1970–1980)
- John P. McGonigle (1985–1994)
- James DiPaola (1996–2010)
- John Granara (Special) (2010–2011)
- Peter Koutoujian (2011–Present)

Notably, the Middlesex County Sheriff also holds a ceremonial role at Harvard University, where it is tradition for the Sheriff to call commencement meetings to order and to adjourn them.

== Politics ==
Voter registration and party enrollment as of August 2024
Unenrolled	712,349	62.46%
Democratic	327,852	29.07%
Republican	77,758	6.9%
Libertarian	3,095	0.27%
Other parties	6,641	0.59%
Total	1,127,675	100%

Prior to 1960, Middlesex County was a Republican Party stronghold, backing only two Democratic Party presidential candidates from 1856 to 1956. From the 1960 election the trend reversed; the county has exclusively supported Democratic presidential candidates. This has intensified in recent decades, as George H. W. Bush in 1988 was the most recent Republican presidential candidate to receive over 40 percent of the county's votes and Mitt Romney in 2012 the last Republican to receive over 30 percent. In 2020, Joe Biden won 71% of the county’s votes, the highest share for any presidential candidate since 1964.

United States presidential election results for Middlesex County, Massachusetts
Year	Republican		Democratic		Third party(ies)	
Year	No.	%	No.	%	No.	%
1868	24,694	66.47%	12,454	33.53%	0	0.00%
1872	26,570	68.12%	12,434	31.88%	0	0.00%
1876	27,304	58.02%	19,561	41.57%	193	0.41%
1880	30,339	59.31%	19,801	38.71%	1,013	1.98%
1884	27,654	48.50%	22,206	38.95%	7,157	12.55%
1888	35,768	54.31%	28,570	43.38%	1,519	2.31%
1892	40,375	52.37%	34,769	45.10%	1,946	2.52%
1896	57,281	71.36%	19,591	24.41%	3,394	4.23%
1900	49,638	60.57%	29,476	35.97%	2,841	3.47%
1904	55,704	60.63%	32,889	35.80%	3,275	3.56%
1908	58,672	61.19%	31,362	32.71%	5,853	6.10%
1912	30,511	29.66%	36,689	35.67%	35,667	34.67%
1916	60,802	53.77%	49,844	44.08%	2,426	2.15%
1920	156,636	69.90%	61,661	27.52%	5,781	2.58%
1924	162,530	63.68%	64,544	25.29%	28,161	11.03%
1928	189,189	52.00%	173,339	47.64%	1,313	0.36%
1932	184,486	50.44%	174,257	47.64%	7,008	1.92%
1936	199,704	47.60%	189,512	45.17%	30,304	7.22%
1940	242,658	52.36%	218,663	47.18%	2,116	0.46%
1944	236,102	52.81%	210,253	47.03%	725	0.16%
1948	228,262	46.98%	248,240	51.09%	9,406	1.94%
1952	316,069	56.99%	236,910	42.72%	1,626	0.29%
1956	343,125	61.12%	216,668	38.60%	1,580	0.28%
1960	246,126	40.78%	356,130	59.01%	1,260	0.21%
1964	134,729	23.36%	439,790	76.25%	2,291	0.40%
1968	188,304	32.60%	370,310	64.11%	18,982	3.29%
1972	269,064	43.56%	345,343	55.91%	3,244	0.53%
1976	260,044	40.42%	359,919	55.94%	23,419	3.64%
1980	256,999	40.30%	270,751	42.46%	109,929	17.24%
1984	319,604	49.42%	325,065	50.26%	2,085	0.32%
1988	290,352	43.82%	361,563	54.57%	10,713	1.62%
1992	193,703	28.10%	343,994	49.89%	151,756	22.01%
1996	169,926	27.06%	398,190	63.41%	59,861	9.53%
2000	198,914	30.27%	404,043	61.49%	54,091	8.23%
2004	237,815	34.52%	440,862	63.99%	10,283	1.49%
2008	245,766	33.85%	464,484	63.98%	15,781	2.17%
2012	267,321	35.45%	471,804	62.56%	15,045	1.99%
2016	219,793	27.59%	520,360	65.31%	56,582	7.10%
2020	226,956	26.28%	617,196	71.47%	19,425	2.25%
2024	235,118	28.85%	554,471	68.05%	25,243	3.10%

== Communities ==
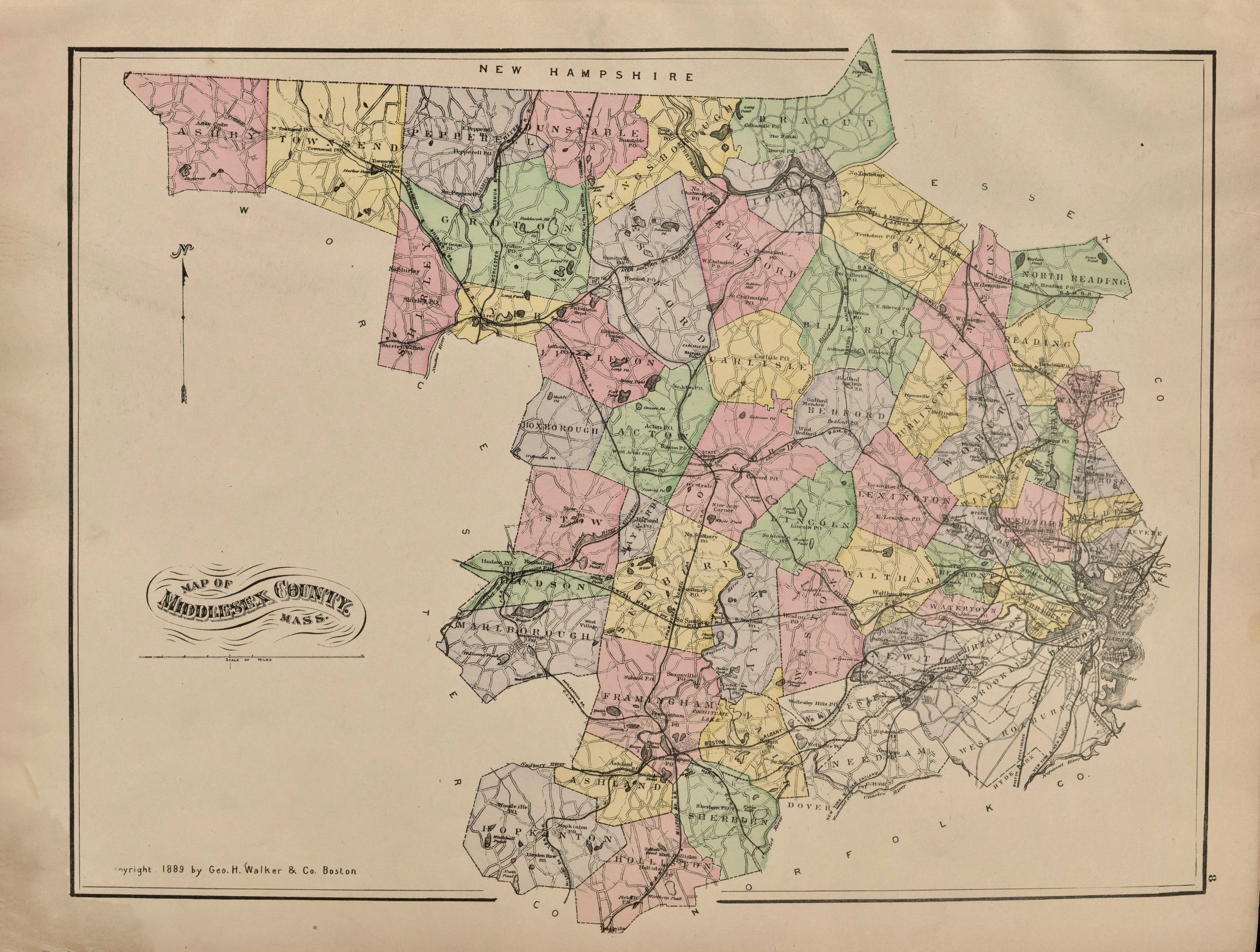
1889 map of Middlesex County

Map of Middlesex County, with Cambridge highlighted

Most municipalities in Middlesex County have a town form of government; the remainder are cities, and are so designated on this list. Villages listed below are census or postal divisions but have no separate corporate or statutory existence from the cities and towns in which they are located.

=== Cities ===
- Cambridge (traditional county seat) de jure
- Everett
- Framingham
- Lowell (traditional county seat)
- Malden
- Marlborough
- Medford
- Melrose
- Newton
- Somerville
- Waltham
- Watertown
- Woburn

=== Towns ===
- Acton
- Arlington
- Ashby
- Ashland
- Ayer
- Bedford
- Belmont
- Billerica
- Boxborough
- Burlington
- Carlisle
- Chelmsford
- Concord
- Dracut
- Dunstable
- Groton
- Holliston
- Hopkinton
- Hudson
- Lexington
- Lincoln
- Littleton
- Maynard
- Natick
- North Reading
- Pepperell
- Reading
- Sherborn
- Shirley
- Stoneham
- Stow
- Sudbury
- Tewksbury
- Townsend
- Tyngsborough
- Wakefield
- Wayland
- Westford
- Weston
- Wilmington
- Winchester

=== Census-designated places ===
- Ayer
- Cochituate
- Devens
- East Pepperell
- Groton
- Hanscom AFB
- Hopkinton
- Hudson
- Littleton Common
- Pepperell
- Pinehurst
- Shirley
- Townsend
- West Concord

=== Other villages and neighborhoods ===
- Auburndale
- Chestnut Hill
- East Lexington
- Felchville
- Forge Village
- Gleasondale
- Graniteville
- Greenwood
- Melrose Highlands
- Nabnasset
- Newton Centre
- Newton Highlands
- Newton Lower Falls
- Newton Upper Falls
- Newtonville
- Nonantum
- North Billerica
- North Chelmsford
- North Woburn
- Pingryville
- Saxonville
- Thompsonville
- Waban
- West Newton

== Education ==
School districts include:

K-12:

- Ayer-Shirley School District
- Acton-Boxborough Regional School District
- Arlington School District
- Ashland School District
- Bedford School District
- Belmont School District
- Billerica School District
- Burlington School District
- Cambridge Public School District
- Chelmsford School District
- Dracut School District
- Everett School District
- Framingham School District
- Groton-Dunstable School District
- Holliston School District
- Hopkinton School District
- Hudson School District
- Lexington School District
- Littleton School District
- Lowell Public Schools
- Malden School District
- Marlborough School District
- Maynard School District
- Medford Public Schools
- Melrose School District
- Nashoba Regional School District
- Natick School District
- Newton School District
- North Middlesex School District
- North Reading School District
- Reading Public Schools
- Somerville School District
- Stoneham School District
- Tewksbury School District
- Tyngsborough School District
- Wakefield School District
- Waltham Public Schools
- Watertown School District
- Wayland School District
- Westford School District
- Weston School District
- Wilmington School District
- Winchester School District
- Woburn School District

Secondary:

- Concord-Carlisle School District
- Dover-Sherborn School District
- Lincoln-Sudbury School District

Elementary:

- Carlisle School District
- Concord School District
- Lincoln School District
- Sherborn School District
- Sudbury School District

Tertiary institutions include:

- Harvard University (Cambridge)
- Massachusetts Institute of Technology (MIT) (Cambridge)
- Tufts University (Medford & Somerville)
- University of Massachusetts Lowell (Lowell)
- Framingham State University (Framingham)
- Middlesex Community College (Massachusetts) (Lowell & Bedford)

== Culture ==
Middlesex County is home to the Middlesex County Volunteers, a fife and drum corps that plays music from the 17th, 18th, 19th and 20th centuries. Founded in 1982 at the end of the United States Bicentennial celebration, the group performs extensively throughout New England. They have also performed at the Boston Pops, throughout the British Isles and Western Europe, and at the Edinburgh Military Tattoo's Salute to Australia in Sydney, Australia.

== See also ==
- Middlesex, historic county of England
- List of Massachusetts locations by per capita income
- Registry of Deeds (Massachusetts)
- National Register of Historic Places listings in Middlesex County, Massachusetts
- Middlesex Fells
- Middlesex Turnpike (Massachusetts)
- Middlesex County Sheriff's Office
