= Massachusetts Route 225 =

State highway in Massachusetts, US

Route 225
- Route 225 highlighted in red

Route information
- Maintained by MassDOT
- Length: 31.100 mi (50.051 km)
- Existed: 1957 (renumbered from Route 25)–present

Major junctions
- West end: Route 2A in Lunenburg
- Route 111 / Route 119 in Groton; Route 110 in Westford; I-95 / Route 128 in Lexington
- East end: Route 2 in Lexington

Location
- Country: United States
- State: Massachusetts
- Counties: Worcester, Middlesex

Highway system
- Massachusetts State Highway System; Interstate; US; State
← Route 220	→ Route 228

Route 225 is a state highway in the U.S. state of Massachusetts. The highway runs 31.100 miles (50.051 km) from Route 2A in Lunenburg in northeastern Worcester County east to Route 2 in Lexington. Route 225 serves the western Middlesex County towns of Shirley, Groton, Westford, and Carlisle. The highway also passes through Bedford along its concurrency with Route 4, which ends at the same junction with Route 2.

== Route description ==
=== Lunenberg – Shirley ===
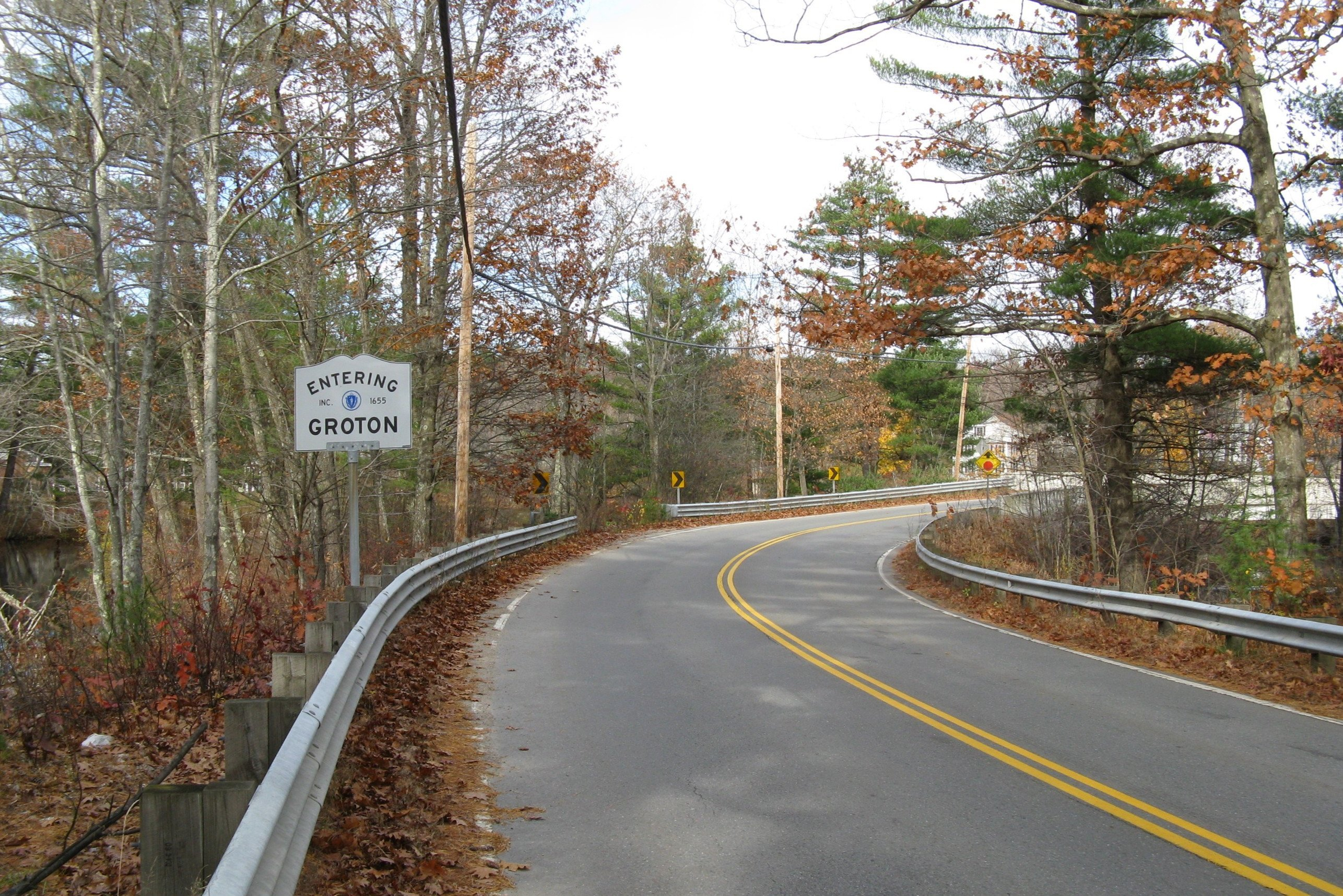
Eastbound Route 225 entering Groton

Route 225 begins at an intersection with Route 2A (Massachusetts Avenue) on the east side of the town of Lunenburg in Worcester County. The two-lane highway's name changes from Old Massachusetts Avenue to Groton Road when it enters the town of Shirley in Middlesex County. Route 225's name is West Main Street between its two crossings of the Nashua River—at the Shirley–Groton town line and closer to the center of Groton—and continues from the latter crossing as Long Hill Road.

=== Groton - Westford ===
The highway turns north onto Farmers Row to run concurrently with Route 111, then the two routes follow Pleasant Street, which crosses the Nashua River Rail Trail, until Route 111 diverges onto Elm Street. Route 225 continues on Pleasant Street until it joins Route 119 on Main Street. Near the south end of downtown, the routes meet the west end of Route 40 (Lowell Road).

Route 225 and Route 119 continue southeast along Boston Road to their split in the southeast corner of Groton, where Route 119 continues along Boston Road while Route 225 turns east onto Forge Village Road. The highway enters the town of Westford along Prescott Street and has a grade crossing of a railroad, where the highway continues on Pleasant Street. Southeast of the town center, Route 225 continues along Concord Road. The highway crosses under Interstate 495 (I-495) with no access shortly before its western junction with Route 110 (Littleton Road). The two routes briefly run concurrently on four-lane Littleton Road before Route 225 diverges onto Concord Road, which becomes Carlisle Road midway between Route 110 and Route 27 (Acton Road). East of Route 27, Route 225 enters Carlisle, where the highway follows Westford Street and then Bedford Road east of the town center.

=== Bedford ===
Route 225 crosses the Concord River and enters the town of Bedford on Carlisle Road. At the west end of the town center, the highway joins Route 4 on North Road before the two highways join Route 62 (Concord Road) on The Great Road. Route 62 splits north onto Brookside Road and the remaining two routes cross the Shawsheen River and continue to Lexington, which they enter on Bedford Street.

=== Lexington ===
Route 225 and Route 4 temporarily expand to a four-lane divided highway through their cloverleaf interchange with I-95 and Route 128 (Yankee Division Highway). In the center of Lexington, the highways turn onto Massachusetts Avenue, which they follow southeast parallel to the Minuteman Bikeway through a brief concurrency with Route 2A between Marrett Road and Maple Street. Near the southeast end of Lexington, Route 225 and Route 4 turn from Massachusetts Avenue, which continues toward Arlington, onto Pleasant Street and then Watertown Street to their joint terminus at a four-ramp partial cloverleaf interchange with Route 2 (Concord Turnpike). The roadway continues south as Winter Street toward Belmont.

== History ==
Route 225 was formerly known as Route 25 before the construction of I-495 south of Raynham in 1957, which was given the Route 25 designation. The stretch of highway between the Bourne Bridge in Bourne and the I-495–I-195 interchange in Wareham still bears the Route 25 designation, while the rest of Route 25 became an extension of I-495 in 1987.

== Major intersections ==
County	Location	mi	km	Destinations	Notes
Worcester	Lunenburg	0.000	0.000	Route 2A (Massachusetts Avenue) – Lunenburg, Fitchburg	Western terminus
Middlesex	Groton	4.913	7.907	Route 111 south (Farmers Row) – Ayer	Western end of Route 111 concurrency
Middlesex	Groton	5.402	8.694	Route 111 north (Elm Street) to Route 119 west – Pepperell, Townsend	Eastern end of Route 111 concurrency
Middlesex	Groton	5.532	8.903	Route 119 west to Route 111 north – Pepperell, Townsend	Western end of Route 119 concurrency
Middlesex	Groton	5.987	9.635	Route 40 east (Lowell Road) – Westford, Chelmsford	Western terminus of Route 40
Middlesex	Groton	9.397	15.123	Route 119 east (Boston Road) – Littleton	Eastern end of Route 119 concurrency
Middlesex	Westford	13.881	22.339	Route 110 west (Littleton Road) – Littleton	Western end of Route 110 concurrency
Middlesex	Westford	14.211	22.870	Route 110 east (Littleton Road) – Chelmsford, Lowell	Eastern end of Route 110 concurrency
Middlesex	Westford	17.027	27.402	Route 27 (Acton Road) – Acton, Chelmsford, Billerica	
Middlesex	Bedford	23.839	38.365	Route 4 north (North Road) – Billerica, Chelmsford	Western end of Route 4 concurrency
Middlesex	Bedford	24.000	38.624	Route 62 west (Concord Road) – Concord, Maynard	Western end of Route 62 concurrency
Middlesex	Bedford	24.874	40.031	Route 62 east (Brookside Road) – Burlington, Wilmington	Eastern end of Route 62 concurrency
Middlesex	Lexington	26.594	42.799	I-95 / Route 128 – Canton, Providence, RI, Peabody, Portsmouth, NH	Exits 49A-B on I-95
Middlesex	Lexington	29.641	47.703	Route 2A west (Marrett Road) – Hanscom Field, Concord	Western end of Route 2A concurrency
Middlesex	Lexington	29.766	47.904	Route 2A east (Maple Street) – Arlington	Eastern end of Route 2A concurrency
Middlesex	Lexington	31.100	50.051	Route 2 (Concord Turnpike) – Concord, Fitchburg, Cambridge, Boston Route 4 ends	Eastern terminus; southern terminus of Route 4; exit 131 on Route 2
1.000 mi = 1.609 km; 1.000 km = 0.621 mi: Concurrency terminus
