= Groton (CDP), Massachusetts =

Place in Massachusetts, United States

Groton, Massachusetts
- Census-designated place
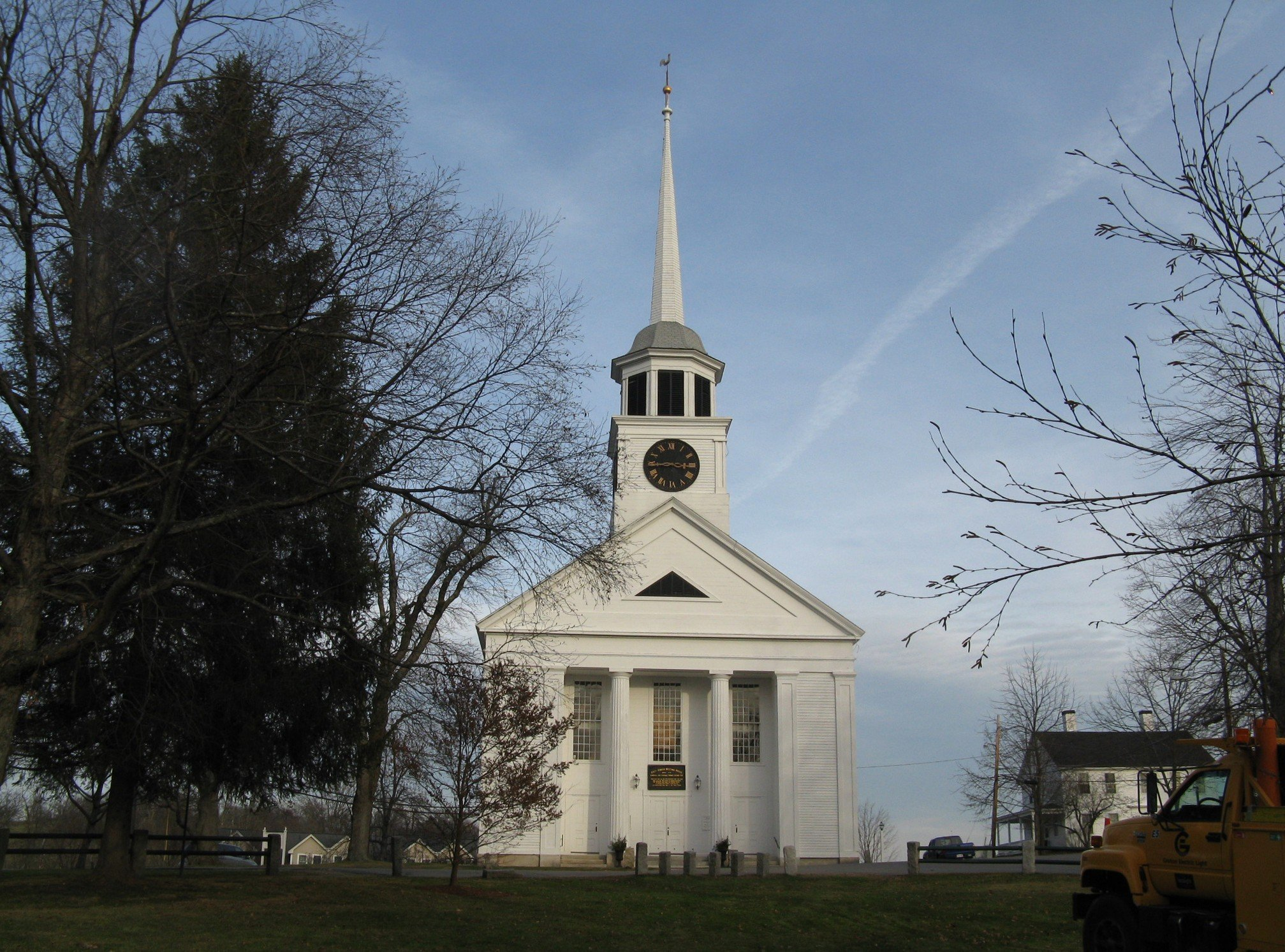
- First Parish Church of Groton

- Location in Middlesex County in Massachusetts
- Coordinates: 42°36′30″N 71°34′21″W
- Country: United States
- State: Massachusetts
- County: Middlesex
- Town: Groton

Area
  - Total: 1.67 sq mi (4.33 km^{2})
  - Land: 1.67 sq mi (4.33 km^{2})
  - Water: 0 sq mi (0.00 km^{2})
- Elevation: 331 ft (101 m)

Population (2020)
  - Total: 1,353
  - Density: 809.3/sq mi (312.46/km^{2})
- Time zone: UTC-5 (Eastern (EST))
  - Summer (DST): UTC-4 (EDT)
- ZIP code: 01450
- Area code: 978
- FIPS code: 25-27445
- GNIS feature ID: 0611119

Groton is a census-designated place (CDP) comprising the main village in the town of Groton in Middlesex County, Massachusetts, United States. The population of the CDP was 1,353 at the 2020 census, out of 11,315 in the entire town of Groton.

== Geography ==
Groton village is located in northwestern Middlesex County at 42°36′30″N 71°34′21″W (42.608216, -71.572526), in the center of the town of Groton. Several state highways converge in the village. Massachusetts Route 111 leads north 4 miles (6 km) to Pepperell and 15 miles (24 km) to Nashua, New Hampshire, while to the south it leads 4 miles (6 km) to Ayer. Route 119 runs northwest out of the village with Route 111 but instead leads 8 miles (13 km) to Townsend, while to the southeast it leads 14 miles (23 km) to West Concord. Route 40 leads east 11 miles (18 km) to North Chelmsford, and Route 225 runs southeast out of Groton with Route 119 but leads 19 miles (31 km) to Bedford.

According to the United States Census Bureau, the Groton CDP has a total area of 1.67 square miles (4.33 km^{2}), of which 0.001 square miles (0.003 km^{2}), or 0.06%, are water. It is in the Nashua River watershed.

== Demographics ==
Historical population
Census	Pop.	Note	%±
1960	1,178		—
1970	1,314		11.5%
1980	1,264		−3.8%
1990	1,044		−17.4%
2000	1,113		6.6%
2010	1,124		1.0%
2020	1,353		20.4%
U.S. Decennial Census

As of the census of 2000, there were 1,113 people, 442 households, and 260 families residing in the CDP. The population density was 254.3 people/km^{2} (659 people/mi^{2}). There were 459 housing units at an average density of 104.9 units/km^{2} (272 units/mi^{2}). The racial makeup of the CDP was 94.61% White, 0.72% Black or African American, 0.27% Native American, 1.08% Asian, 0.18% Pacific Islander, 0.99% from other races, and 2.16% from two or more races. Hispanic or Latino of any race were 1.44% of the population.

There were 442 households, out of which 33.0% had children under the age of 18 living with them, 46.8% were married couples living together, 9.5% had a female householder with no husband present, and 41.0% were non-families. 34.4% of all households were made up of individuals, and 15.4% had someone living alone who was 65 years of age or older. The average household size was 2.35 and the average family size was 3.14.

In the CDP, the population was spread out, with 27.7% under the age of 18, 6.7% from 18 to 24, 31.3% from 25 to 44, 21.1% from 45 to 64, and 13.2% who were 65 years of age or older. The median age was 35 years. For every 100 females, there were 86.7 males. For every 100 females age 18 and over, there were 76.5 males.

The median income for a household in the CDP was $58,409, and the median income for a family was $80,981. Males had a median income of $60,833 versus $32,292 for females. The per capita income for the CDP was $33,044. About 6.6% of families and 11.4% of the population were below the poverty line, including 15.3% of those under age 18 and none of those age 65 or over.
