= Massachusetts Route 111 =

Highway in Massachusetts, United States

Route 111
- Route 111 highlighted in red

Route information
- Maintained by MassDOT
- Length: 27.282 mi (43.906 km)
- Existed: 1926–present

Major junctions
- South end: Route 2 / Route 2A / Route 119 in Concord
- I-495 in Boxborough; Route 2 in Harvard; Route 119 / Route 225 in Groton
- North end: NH 111 at the New Hampshire state line in Pepperell

Location
- Country: United States
- State: Massachusetts
- Counties: Worcester, Middlesex

Highway system
- Massachusetts State Highway System; Interstate; US; State
← Route 110A	→ Route 112

Route 111 is a 27.282-mile-long (43.906 km) state highway in Massachusetts. The route has a north–south component and an east–west one, though it is signed exclusively as a north–south route on newer signs. The east–west portion of the route largely follows the path of the Union Turnpike, built in the early 19th century to connect the communities of Leominster and Concord. (A few older east–west directional signs still exist east of Harvard.)

== Route description ==
Route 111 begins in Concord at the rotary junction of Route 2, Route 2A and Route 119, next to Massachusetts Correctional Institution – Concord. The route is concurrent along Union Turnpike with Route 2 for the first 2.4 miles (3.9 km) into Acton, before Route 2 heads northwestward. Route 111 continues along Massachusetts Avenue, having a junction with Route 27 not far from the split. The split is Exit 118 (old exit 43).

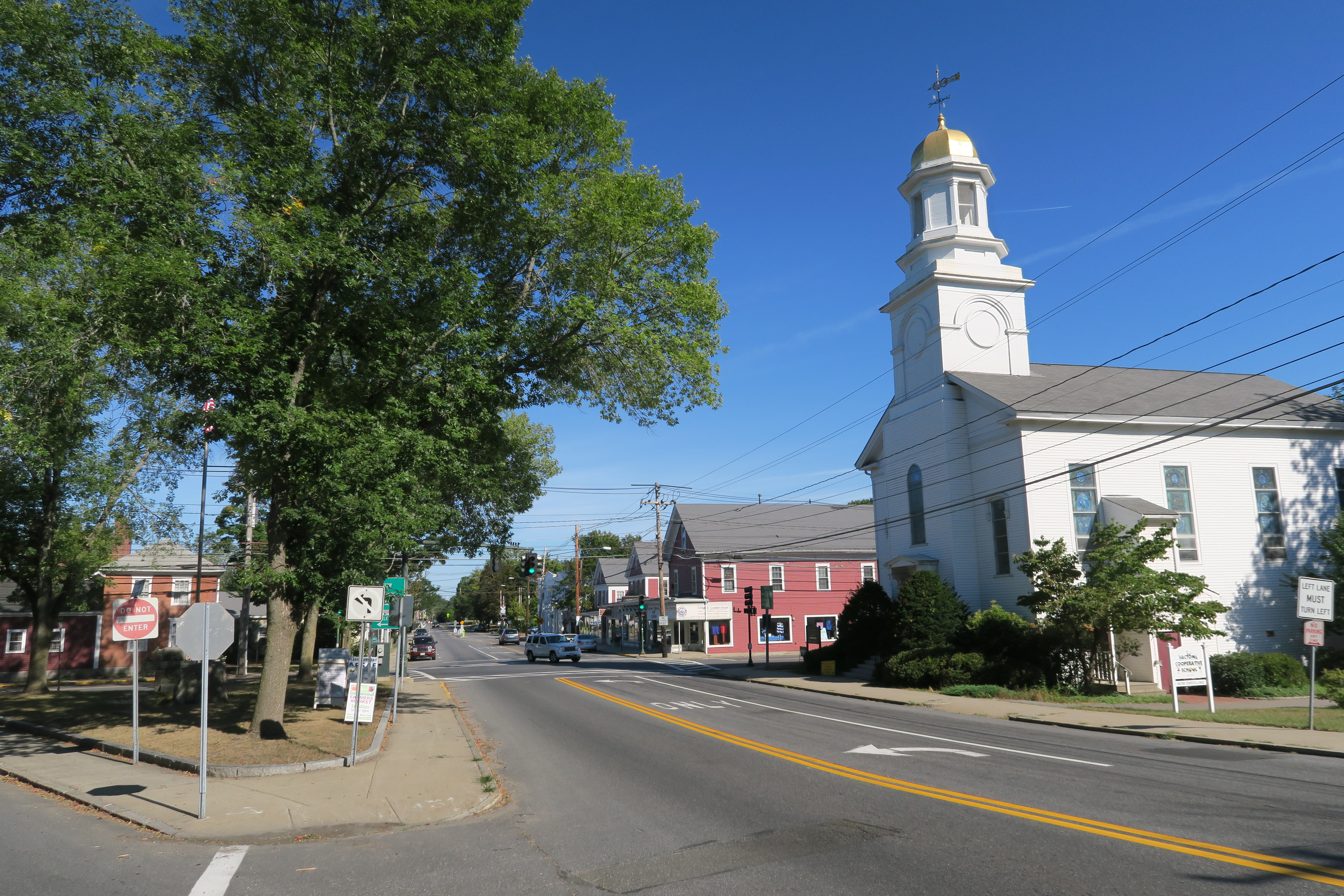
Route 111 eastbound in West Acton

Route 111 continues relatively westward along Massachusetts Avenue through Boxborough, meeting I-495 at Exit 75 (old exit 28), just before entering Harvard. In Harvard, the route leaves Massachusetts Avenue at its far western end, looping around until it meets Route 110 at that town's center. The two routes continue northward, crossing Route 2 at exit 109 (old exit 38), before continuing northward, east of Fort Devens into Ayer. In Ayer, Route 111 splits from Route 110 as that route turns eastward with Route 2A Eastbound, while Route 111 turns westbound along that route, passing concurrently with it along Ayer's Main Street.

After turning northward again, Routes 111 and 2A split, just west of Moore Army Air Field, with Route 111 turning more northerly into Groton. In Groton, Route 111 joins Route 225 near the center of town, with the two of them meeting Route 119. At this point, Route 225 joins Route 119 eastbound while Route 111 joins Route 119 west bound. The two routes head northwestward and cross the Nashua River into the town of Pepperell concurrently. Once in Pepperell, Route 111 turns northward again, running in roughly the same direction as the river. It crosses Route 113 near the center of Pepperell before continuing northward as it enters Hollis, New Hampshire and becomes New Hampshire Route 111.

== Major intersections ==
County	Location	mi	km	Old exit	New exit	Destinations	Notes
Middlesex	Concord	0.000	0.000			Route 2 east / Route 2A / Route 119 west to Route 62 / Route 126 south – Cambridge, Boston, Littleton	Roundabout; southern terminus; southern end of Route 2 concurrency; eastern terminus of Route 119
Middlesex	Acton	2.400	3.862	43	118	Route 2 west – Athol, Greenfield	Northbound exit and southbound entrance; northern end of Route 2 concurrency
Middlesex	Acton	2.400	3.862	Northern end of limited-access section			
Middlesex	Acton	2.900	4.667			Route 27 – Maynard, Sudbury, Lowell	
Middlesex	Boxborough	7.600	12.231			I-495 – Marlboro, Lowell, Lawrence	Exit 75 on I-495; partial cloverleaf interchange
Worcester	Harvard	10.300	16.576			Route 110 west – Bolton, Clinton	Southern end of Route 110 concurrency
Worcester	Harvard	11.900	19.151			Route 2 – Concord, Boston, Athol, Greenfield	Exit 109 on Route 2; cloverleaf interchange
Middlesex	Ayer	14.100	22.692			Route 2A east / Route 110 east – Littleton	Roundabout; northern end of Route 110 concurrency; southern end of Route 2A concurrency
Middlesex	Ayer	15.800	25.428			Route 2A west – Lunenburg, Fitchburg	Northern end of Route 2A concurrency
Middlesex	Groton	18.600	29.934			Route 225 west – Lunenburg	Southern end of Route 225 concurrency
Middlesex	Groton	19.200	30.899			Route 119 east / Route 225 east – Westford, Groton	Northern end of Route 225 concurrency; southern end of Route 119 concurrency
Middlesex	Pepperell	21.000	33.796			Route 119 west – Townsend, Ashby	Northern end of Route 119 concurrency
Middlesex	Pepperell	23.800	38.302			Route 113 – Townsend, Dunstable, Tyngsboro	
Middlesex	Pepperell	27.282	43.906			NH 111 east – Hollis, Nashua	Continuation into New Hampshire
1.000 mi = 1.609 km; 1.000 km = 0.621 mi: Concurrency terminus
