= Waltham Public Schools =

School district in Massachusetts, United States

Waltham Public Schools is a school district headquartered in Waltham, Massachusetts.

== Schools ==
High schools

- Waltham High School

Middle schools

- Kennedy Middle School
- McDevitt Middle School

Elementary schools

- Fitzgerald Elementary School
- MacArthur Elementary School
- Northeast Elementary School
- Plympton Elementary School
- Stanley Elementary School
- Whittemore Elementary School

== History ==
In 1999 the school system stated that it wanted to correct a racial imbalance in its school system to comply with state laws and drafted a $101 million school construction program. Waltham Public Schools requested that the state government pay 90% of the costs of constructing new schools.
