= Massachusetts Route 119 =

Highway in Massachusetts, United States

Route 119
- Route 119 highlighted in red

Route information
- Maintained by MassDOT
- Length: 35.60 mi (57.29 km)
- Existed: 1922–present

Major junctions
- West end: NH 119 at the New Hampshire state line near Ashburnham
- Route 13 in Townsend; I-495 in Littleton; Route 2A / Route 110 in Littleton
- East end: Route 2 / Route 2A / Route 111 in Concord

Location
- Country: United States
- State: Massachusetts
- Counties: Worcester, Middlesex

Highway system
- Massachusetts State Highway System; Interstate; US; State
← Route 118	→ Route 120

Route 119 is a 35.60-mile-long (57.29 km) northwest-southeast state highway in Massachusetts. Its western terminus is a continuation of New Hampshire Route 119 at the New Hampshire border and its eastern terminus is at Route 2 and Route 111 in Concord. It acts as a continuation of New Hampshire Route 119, which is in turn a continuation of Vermont Route 119.

== Route description ==
Route 119 begins in Ashburnham at the New Hampshire state line. The route passes through Ashburnham State Forest, south of Mount Watatic, and meets Route 101 at its northern end, just west of where Route 119 enters into Ashby. In Ashby, Route 119 passes through the center of town, crossing Route 31 before passing through Willard Brook State Forest into the town of Townsend. In Townsend, Route 119 follows along the Squanacook River, crossing it in the town center as well as Route 13.

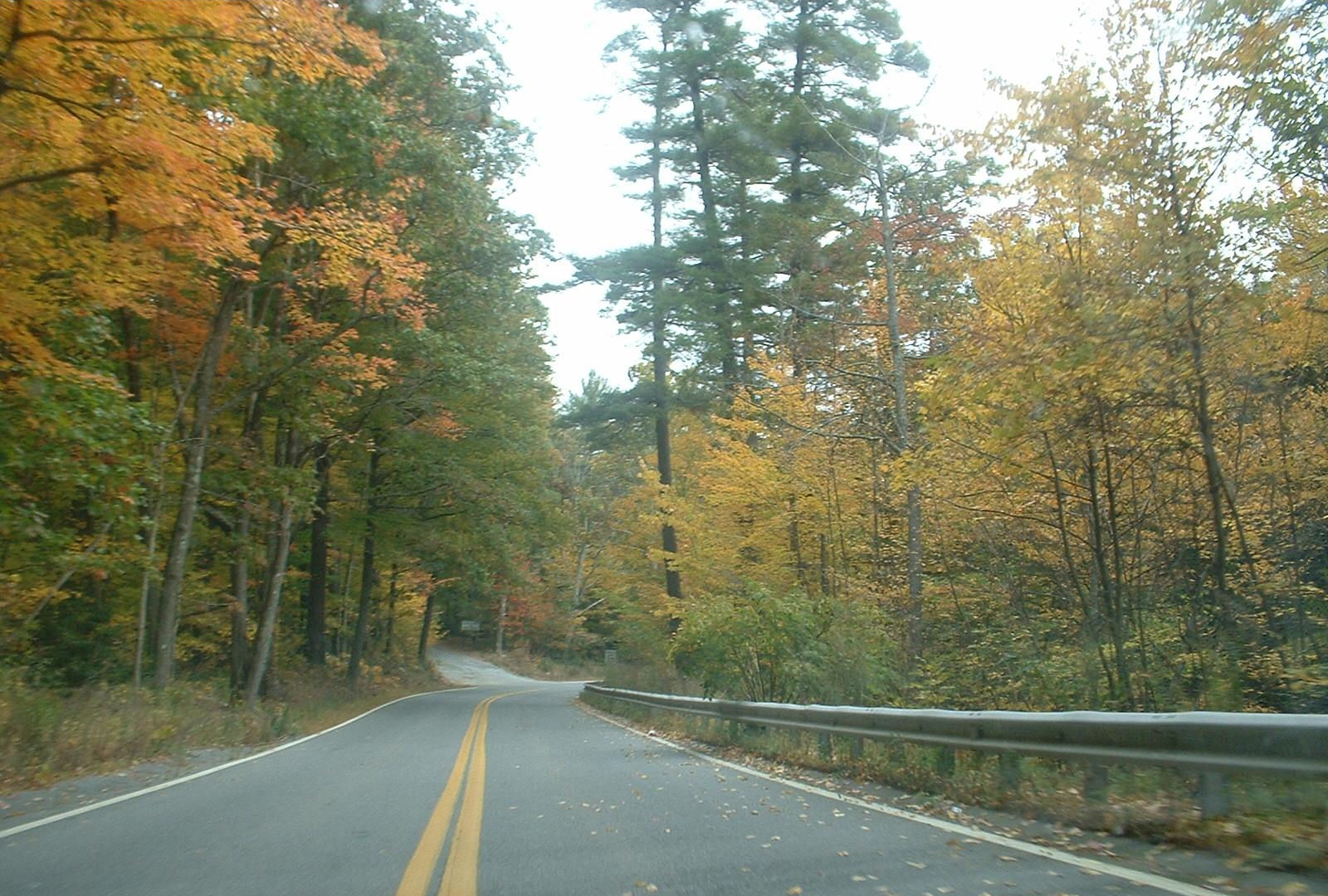
Route 119 in Willard Brook State Forest, Ashby

The route continues eastward, crossing the far western corner of Groton before entering Pepperell. In Pepperell, Route 119 meets the western end of Route 113 as it heads eastward. The route joins Route 111 before the two cross the Nashua River back into Groton. Once in Groton, Route 111 leaves Route 119 as Route 225 joins it. The two routes continue southeastward, passing the western end of Route 40 before the two routes split south of Lost Lake. Route 119 continues southeastward into Littleton.

In Littleton, Route 119 meets I-495 at Exit 80 (formerly 31) before meeting Routes 2A and 110. Route 2A becomes concurrent with Route 119 as it crosses Route 110. The two routes continue southeastward, passing Nagog Pond as they enter Acton. The two routes cross Route 27 south of Nagog Woods. The routes head southward from the junction, passing through East Acton before turning more eastward as they enter Concord. After just a half mile, Route 119 ends at a rotary intersection with Route 2, just north of MCI - Concord and where Route 2A begins a silent concurrency with its parent route.

== Major intersections ==
County	Location	mi	km	Destinations	Notes
Worcester	Ashburnham	0.0	0.0	NH 119 west – Rindge	Continuation into New Hampshire
Worcester	Ashburnham	3.1	5.0	Route 101 south to Route 12 – Ashburnham, Gardner	Northern terminus of Route 101
Middlesex	Ashby	8.0	12.9	Route 31 – Fitchburg, Greenville, NH	
Middlesex	Townsend	11.4	18.3	Route 13 – Leominster, Milford, NH	
Middlesex	Pepperell	17.1	27.5	Route 113 east – Pepperell, Dunstable	Western terminus of Route 113
Middlesex	Pepperell	19.4	31.2	Route 111 north – Pepperell, Nashua, NH	Western end of Route 111 concurrency
Middlesex	Groton	21.2	34.1	Route 111 south / Route 225 west – Ayer, Lunenburg	Eastern end of Route 111 concurrency; western end of Route 225 concurrency
Middlesex	Groton	21.7	34.9	Route 40 east – Westford, Lowell	Western terminus of Route 40
Middlesex	Groton	25.1	40.4	Route 225 east – Westford, Lexington	Eastern end of Route 225 concurrency
Middlesex	Littleton	28.2	45.4	I-495 – Marlboro, Taunton, Lowell	Exit 80 on I-495
Middlesex	Littleton	28.6	46.0	Route 2A west / Route 110 – Chelmsford, Lowell, Ayer, Harvard	Western end of Route 2A concurrency
Middlesex	Acton	32.8	52.8	Route 27 – Chelmsford, Maynard	
Middlesex	Concord	35.6	57.3	Route 2 / Route 2A east / Route 111 north to Route 62 / Route 126 south – Harvard, Greenfield, Cambridge, Boston	Eastern terminus; eastern end of Route 2A concurrency; southern terminus of Route 111
1.000 mi = 1.609 km; 1.000 km = 0.621 mi: Concurrency terminus
