= Townsend (CDP), Massachusetts =

Townsend, Massachusetts
- Census-designated place
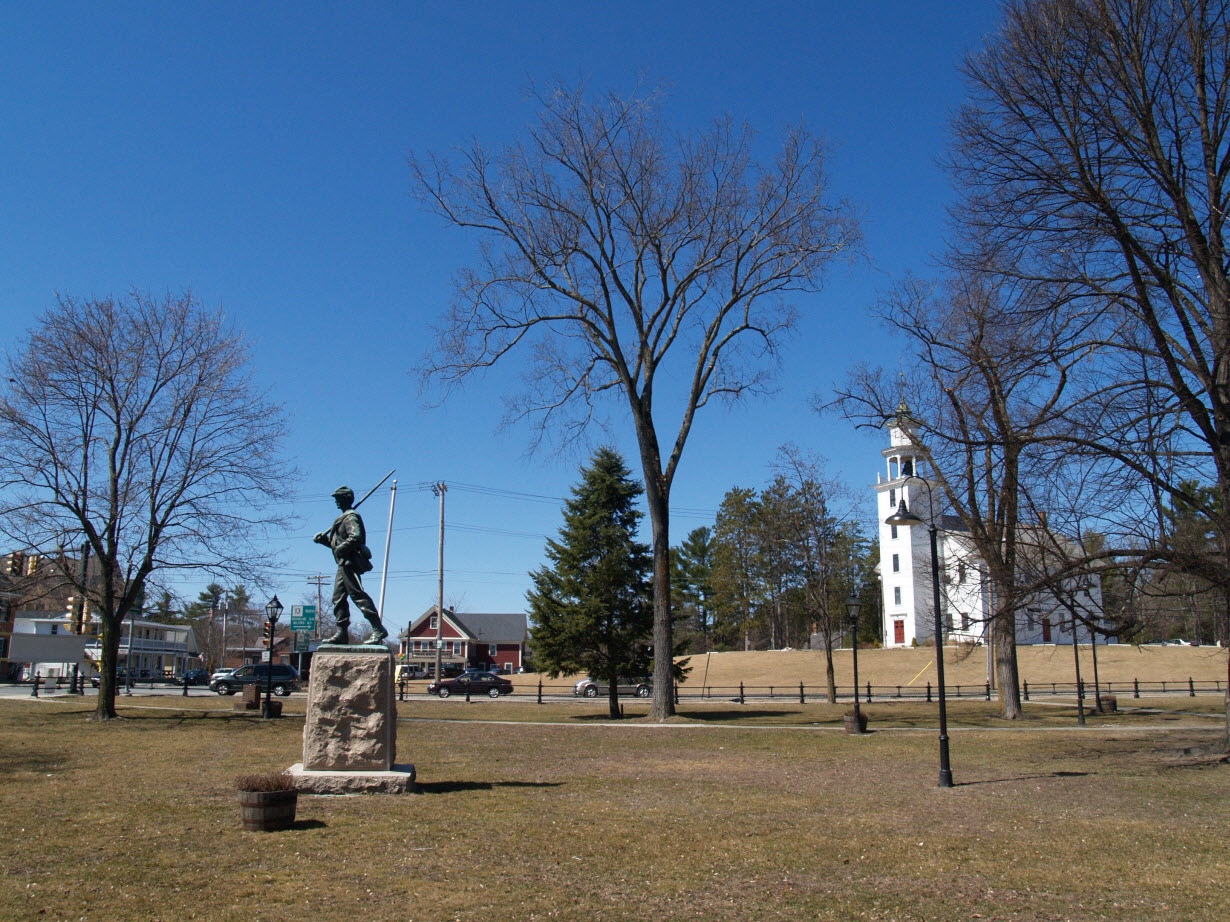
- Townsend Common

- Location in Middlesex County in Massachusetts
- Coordinates: 42°40′4″N 71°42′22″W
- Country: United States
- State: Massachusetts
- County: Middlesex
- Town: Townsend

Area
  - Total: 1.73 sq mi (4.47 km^{2})
  - Land: 1.69 sq mi (4.39 km^{2})
  - Water: 0.031 sq mi (0.08 km^{2})
- Elevation: 315 ft (96 m)

Population (2020)
  - Total: 1,213
  - Density: 716.2/sq mi (276.51/km^{2})
- Time zone: UTC-5 (Eastern (EST))
  - Summer (DST): UTC-4 (EDT)
- ZIP code: 01469
- Area code: 978
- FIPS code: 25-70325
- GNIS feature ID: 0610801

Townsend is a census-designated place (CDP) comprising the main village in the town of Townsend in Middlesex County, Massachusetts, United States. The population was 1,213 at the 2020 census, out of 9,127 in the entire town.

== Geography ==
Townsend village is located in northwestern Middlesex County at 42°40′3″N 71°42′21″W (42.667688, -71.706019), slightly east of the center of the town of Townsend. Massachusetts Route 13 passes through the center of the village, leading south 11 miles (18 km) to Leominster and north 13 miles (21 km) to Milford, New Hampshire. Massachusetts Route 119 (Main Street) crosses Route 13 in the center of town, leading southeast 8 miles (13 km) to Groton and west 7 miles (11 km) to Ashby.

According to the United States Census Bureau, the Townsend CDP has a total area of 1.73 square miles (4.48 km^{2}), of which 0.03 square miles (0.08 km^{2}), or 1.80%, are water. The Squannacook River runs through the western part of the village, flowing southeast to join the Nashua River near Ayer and part of the Merrimack River watershed.

== Demographics ==
Historical population
Census	Pop.	Note	%±
1960	1,101		—
1970	1,329		20.7%
1980	1,266		−4.7%
1990	1,164		−8.1%
2000	1,043		−10.4%
2010	1,128		8.1%
2020	1,213		7.5%
U.S. Decennial Census

As of the census of 2000, there were 1,043 people, 441 households, and 262 families residing in the CDP The population density was 239.7/km^{2} (620.2/mi^{2}). There were 455 housing units at an average density of 104.6/km^{2} (270.5/mi^{2}). The racial makeup of the CDP was 96.84% White, 0.48% Black or African American, 0.67% Native American, 0.29% from other races, and 1.73% from two or more races. Hispanic or Latino of any race were 1.15% of the population.

There were 441 households, out of which 32.7% had children under the age of 18 living with them, 43.3% were married couples living together, 12.9% had a female householder with no husband present, and 40.4% were non-families. 35.8% of all households were made up of individuals, and 17.5% had someone living alone who was 65 years of age or older. The average household size was 2.37 and the average family size was 3.12.

In the CDP, the population was spread out, with 26.8% under the age of 18, 8.5% from 18 to 24, 29.6% from 25 to 44, 21.7% from 45 to 64, and 13.3% who were 65 years of age or older. The median age was 37 years. For every 100 females, there were 81.4 males. For every 100 females age 18 and over, there were 83.0 males.

The median income for a household in the CDP was $50,234, and the median income for a family was $59,500. Males had a median income of $39,813 versus $26,439 for females. The per capita income for the CDP was $25,272. None of the families and 3.3% of the population were living below the poverty line, including no under eighteens and 7.8% of those over 64.
