= West Concord, Massachusetts =

- Census-designated place
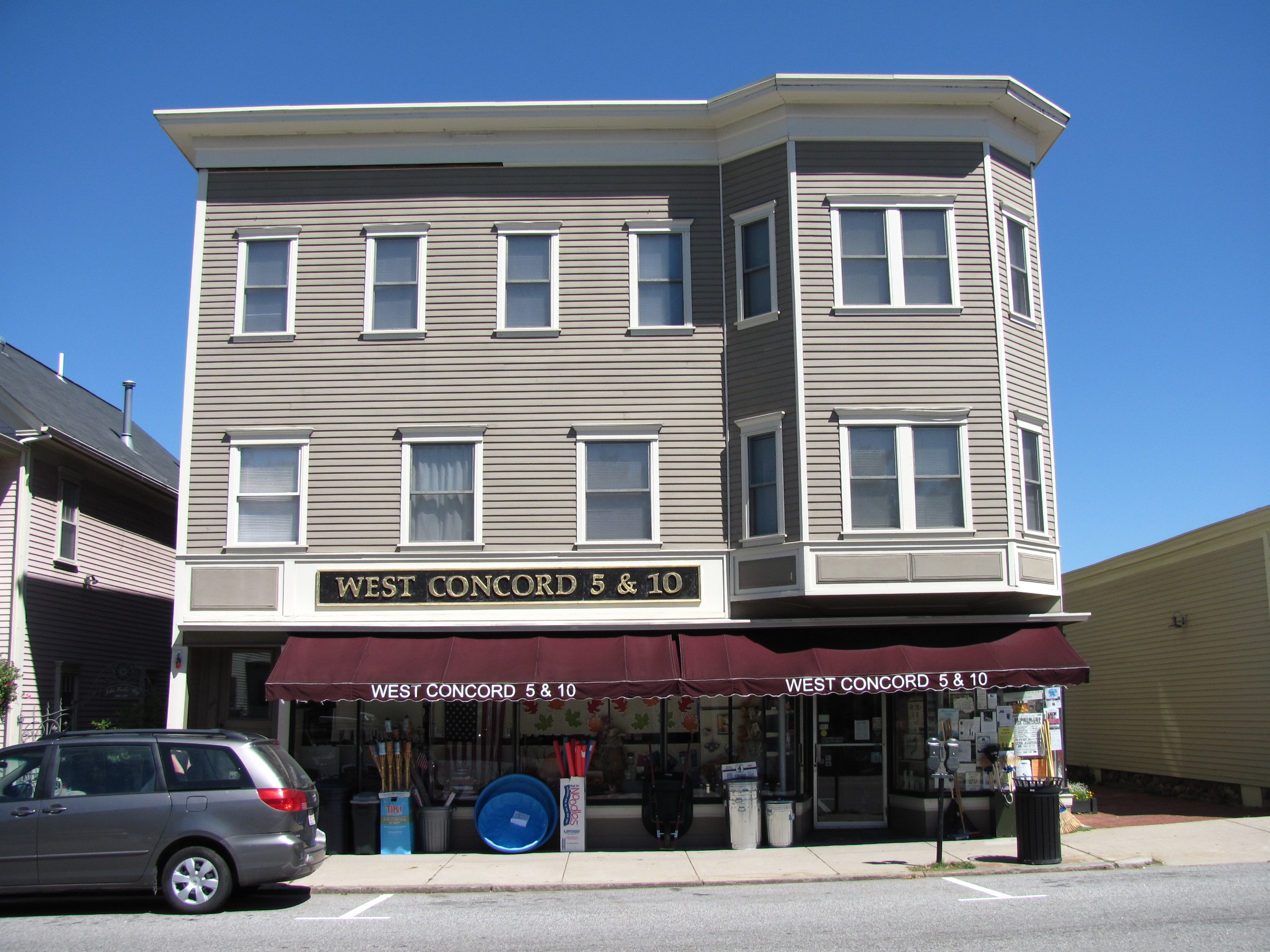
- West Concord 5&10 in 2012 (out of business as of 2026)

- Location in Middlesex County, Massachusetts
- Coordinates: 42°27′17″N 71°24′2″W
- Country: United States
- State: Massachusetts
- County: Middlesex
- Town: Concord

Area
  - Total: 3.58 sq mi (9.27 km^{2})
  - Land: 3.38 sq mi (8.75 km^{2})
  - Water: 0.20 sq mi (0.53 km^{2})
- Elevation: 118 ft (36 m)

Population (2020)
  - Total: 6,320
  - Density: 1,872/sq mi (722.7/km^{2})
- Time zone: UTC-5 (Eastern (EST))
  - Summer (DST): UTC-4 (EDT)
- ZIP code: 01742 (Concord)
- Area code: 978
- FIPS code: 25-75680
- GNIS feature ID: 0611517

West Concord is an unincorporated village and census-designated place (CDP) in the town of Concord in Middlesex County, Massachusetts, United States. The population was 6,320 at the 2020 census.

== Geography ==
West Concord is located in central Middlesex County at 42°27′17″N 71°24′2″W (42.454747, -71.400495), in the southwestern part of the town of Concord. The CDP is bordered to the north by Massachusetts Route 2; to the southeast by Dugan Brook, Caterina Heights, and Second Division Brook; to the southwest by the town of Sudbury; and to the west by the town of Acton.

Massachusetts Route 62 runs through the village as its Main Street, leading east 2 miles (3 km) to the center of Concord and southwest 3.5 miles (5.6 km) to Maynard. Route 2, a major highway, leads southeast 17 miles (27 km) to Cambridge and northwest 21 miles (34 km) to Leominster.

According to the United States Census Bureau, the West Concord CDP has a total area of 3.58 square miles (9.27 km^{2}), of which 3.38 square miles (8.75 km^{2}) are land and 0.20 square miles (0.52 km^{2}) (5.70%), are water. The Assabet River flows through the village just south of its center, running northeastward to join the Concord River on the north side of Concord village. Warners Pond is in the northern part of West Concord, and Kennedys Pond is in the southwest. Via the Assabet and Concord rivers, the CDP is part of the Merrimack River watershed.

== Demographics ==
Historical population
Census	Pop.	Note	%±
1950	1,285		—
1960	1,556		21.1%
1980	5,331		—
1990	5,761		8.1%
2000	5,632		−2.2%
2010	6,028		7.0%
2020	6,320		4.8%
U.S. Decennial Census

=== 2020 census ===
As of the 2020 census, West Concord had a population of 6,320. The median age was 46.9 years. 19.4% of residents were under the age of 18 and 21.8% were 65 years of age or older. For every 100 females, there were 109.5 males, and for every 100 females age 18 and over, there were 108.9 males age 18 and over.

100.0% of residents lived in urban areas, while 0.0% lived in rural areas.

There were 2,430 households, of which 28.8% had children under the age of 18 living in them. Of all households, 54.1% were married-couple households, 12.9% were households with a male householder and no spouse or partner present, and 29.2% were households with a female householder and no spouse or partner present. About 31.6% of all households were made up of individuals and 17.5% had someone living alone who was 65 years of age or older.

There were 2,639 housing units, of which 7.9% were vacant. The homeowner vacancy rate was 1.8% and the rental vacancy rate was 6.5%.

Racial composition as of the 2020 census
Race	Number	Percent
White	5,016	79.4%
Black or African American	313	5.0%
American Indian and Alaska Native	0	0.0%
Asian	423	6.7%
Native Hawaiian and Other Pacific Islander	3	0.0%
Some other race	79	1.2%
Two or more races	486	7.7%
Hispanic or Latino (of any race)	400	6.3%

=== 2000 census ===
At the 2000 census there were 5,632 people, 1,844 households, and 1,296 families living in the CDP. The population density was 637.7/km^{2} (1,651.6/mi^{2}). There were 1,914 housing units at an average density of 216.7/km^{2} (561.3/mi^{2}). The racial makeup of the CDP was 83.59% White, 5.82% Black or African American, 0.11% Native American, 3.50% Asian, 0.02% Pacific Islander, 5.61% from other races, and 1.35% from two or more races. Hispanic or Latino of any race were 6.18%.

Of the 1,844 households 34.2% had children under the age of 18 living with them, 59.7% were married couples living together, 8.5% had a female householder with no husband present, and 29.7% were non-families. 25.4% of households were one person and 10.4% were one person aged 65 or older. The average household size was 2.48 and the average family size was 3.00.

The age distribution was 20.3% under the age of 18, 6.2% from 18 to 24, 35.3% from 25 to 44, 25.5% from 45 to 64, and 12.8% 65 or older. The median age was 39 years. For every 100 females, there were 131.0 males. For every 100 females age 18 and over, there were 142.5 males.

The median household income was $86,096 and the median family income was $102,210. Males had a median income of $56,053 versus $50,774 for females. The per capita income for the CDP was $43,271. About 1.9% of families and 3.0% of the population were below the poverty line, including 1.4% of those under age 18 and 5.6% of those age 65 or over.
