= Ayer (CDP), Massachusetts =

Ayer, Massachusetts
- Census-designated place
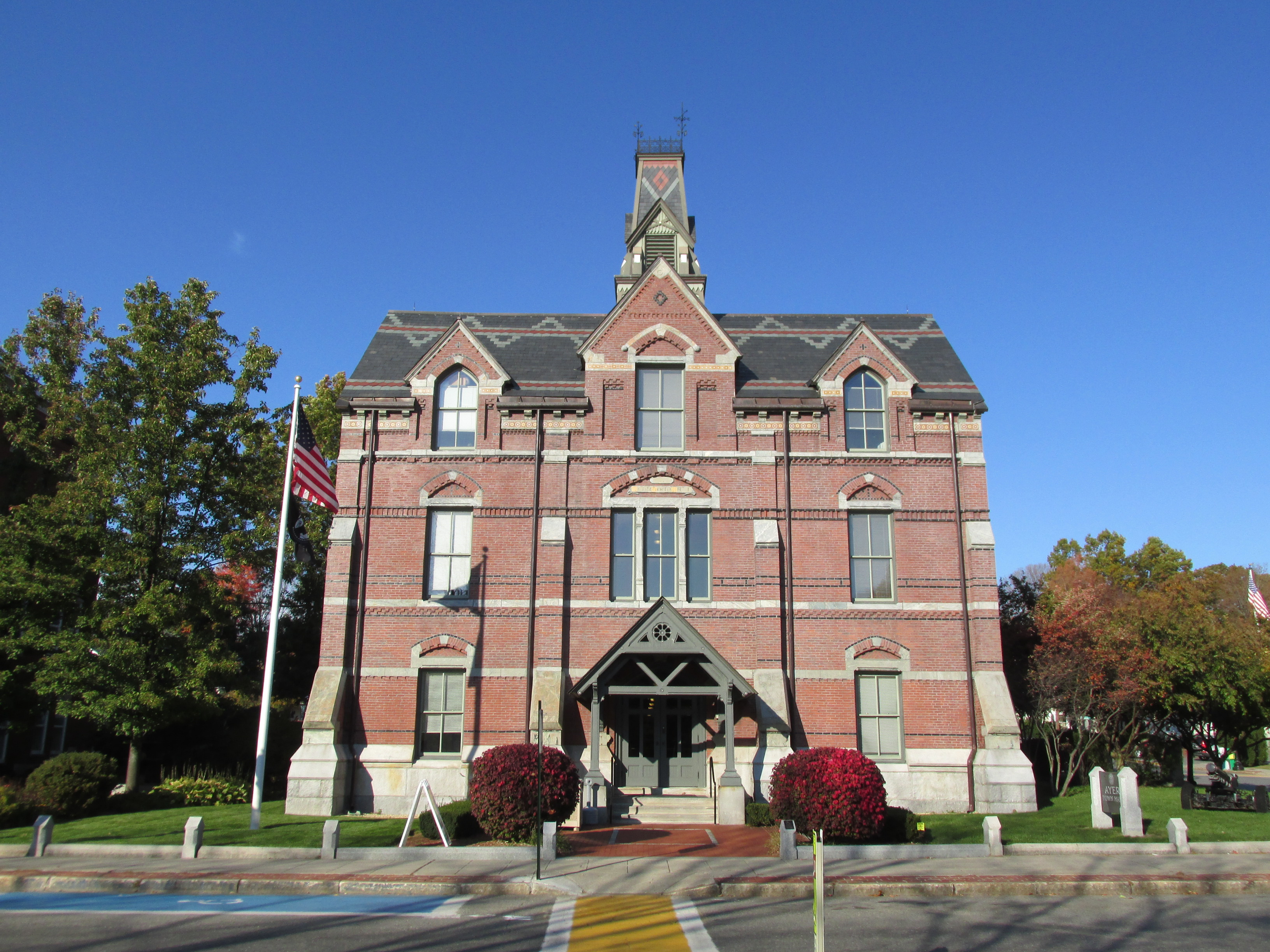
- Town Hall

- Location in Middlesex County in Massachusetts
- Coordinates: 42°33′36″N 71°35′7″W
- Country: United States
- State: Massachusetts
- County: Middlesex
- Town: Ayer

Area
  - Total: 1.39 sq mi (3.60 km^{2})
  - Land: 1.32 sq mi (3.43 km^{2})
  - Water: 0.062 sq mi (0.16 km^{2})
- Elevation: 240 ft (73 m)

Population (2020)
  - Total: 2,986
  - Density: 2,251.5/sq mi (869.31/km^{2})
- Time zone: UTC-5 (Eastern (EST))
  - Summer (DST): UTC-4 (EDT)
- ZIP code: 01432
- Area code: 978
- FIPS code: 25-03040
- GNIS feature ID: 0611084

Ayer is a census-designated place (CDP) and the primary settlement in the town of Ayer, Massachusetts, United States. The population of the CDP was 2,986 at the 2020 census, out of 8,479 in the entire town.

== Geography ==
Ayer is located in northwestern Middlesex County at 42°33′36″N 71°35′7″W (42.560033, -71.585321). The CDP occupies the center of the town of Ayer and is bordered to the west by the Devens CDP.

Massachusetts Routes 2A and 111 pass through the village as Park Street and East Main Street. MA 2A leads west 12 miles (19 km) to Fitchburg and east 5 miles (8 km) to Littleton, while MA 111 leads north 4 miles (6 km) to Groton and south 8 miles (13 km) to Boxborough.

According to the United States Census Bureau, the Ayer CDP has a total area of 1.39 square miles (3.6 km^{2}), of which 1.33 square miles (3.44 km^{2}) are land and 0.06 square miles (0.16 km^{2}), or 4.54%, are water. Grove Pond and Plow Shop Pond lie along the southern edge of the CDP, draining west toward the Nashua River, part of the Merrimack River watershed.

== Demographics ==
Historical population
Census	Pop.	Note	%±
1950	3,107		—
1960	3,323		7.0%
1970	3,292		−0.9%
1980	3,165		−3.9%
1990	2,889		−8.7%
2000	2,960		2.5%
2010	2,868		−3.1%
2020	2,986		4.1%
U.S. Decennial Census

As of the census of 2000, there were 2,960 people, 1,258 households, and 680 families residing in the CDP. The population density was 929.2/km^{2} (2,397.9/mi^{2}). There were 1,369 housing units at an average density of 429.7/km^{2} (1,109.0/mi^{2}). The racial makeup of the CDP was 88.31% White, 4.93% Black or African American, 0.24% Native American, 2.64% Asian, 0.14% Pacific Islander, 1.08% from other races, and 2.67% from two or more races. Hispanic or Latino of any race were 3.11% of the population.

There were 1,258 households, out of which 26.3% had children under the age of 18 living with them, 36.9% were married couples living together, 13.0% had a female householder with no husband present, and 45.9% were non-families. 38.6% of all households were made up of individuals, and 11.6% had someone living alone who was 65 years of age or older. The average household size was 2.20 and the average family size was 2.96.

In the CDP, the population was spread out, with 21.9% under the age of 18, 7.3% from 18 to 24, 35.0% from 25 to 44, 18.2% from 45 to 64, and 17.7% who were 65 years of age or older. The median age was 37 years. For every 100 females, there were 93.7 males. For every 100 females age 18 and over, there were 88.4 males.

The median income for a household in the CDP was $41,808, and the median income for a family was $55,375. Males had a median income of $39,879 versus $32,083 for females. The per capita income for the CDP was $23,574. About 5.2% of families and 9.4% of the population were below the poverty line, including 8.6% of those under age 18 and 17.8% of those age 65 or over.
