= Pepperell =

Pepperell may refer to:

== People ==
- Albert Pepperell (1922–1986), rugby league footballer
- Derek Pepperell (born 1968), English cricketer
- East Bay Ray (born Raymond John Pepperell, born 1958), punk guitarist
- Eddie Pepperell (born 1991), English golfer
- Russell Pepperell (1918–2003), rugby league footballer
- Stan Pepperell (1914–1985), rugby league footballer
- William Pepperrell (1696–1759), merchant and soldier in Colonial Massachusetts
- William Pepperrell the younger (1746–1816), Loyalist of the American Revolutionary War, grandson of William Pepperrell (1696–1759)
- William Pepperell Montague (1873–1953), philosopher

== Places ==
In Canada:

- Pepperrell Air Force Base, a decommissioned U.S. military base located in St. John's, Newfoundland

In the United States:

- Pepperell, Massachusetts, a New England town
  - Pepperell (CDP), Massachusetts, the central village in the town
  - Pepperell Center Historic District
  - East Pepperell, Massachusetts

== See also ==
- Pepperrell (disambiguation)
