= Massachusetts Route 13 =

North-south state highway in Massachusetts, US

Route 13
- Route 13 highlighted in red

Route information
- Maintained by MassDOT
- Length: 14.14 mi (22.76 km)

Major junctions
- South end: Route 12 in Leominster
- Route 2 in Leominster; Route 2A in Lunenburg; Route 119 in Townsend
- North end: NH 13 in Brookline, NH

Location
- Country: United States
- State: Massachusetts
- Counties: Worcester, Middlesex

Highway system
- Massachusetts State Highway System; Interstate; US; State
← Route 12	→ Route 14

Route 13 is a 14.14-mile-long (22.76 km) north–south state highway in the north-central region of the U.S. state of Massachusetts. Its southern terminus is at Route 12 in Leominster and its northern terminus is a continuation as New Hampshire Route 13 near Brookline, New Hampshire.

== Route description ==
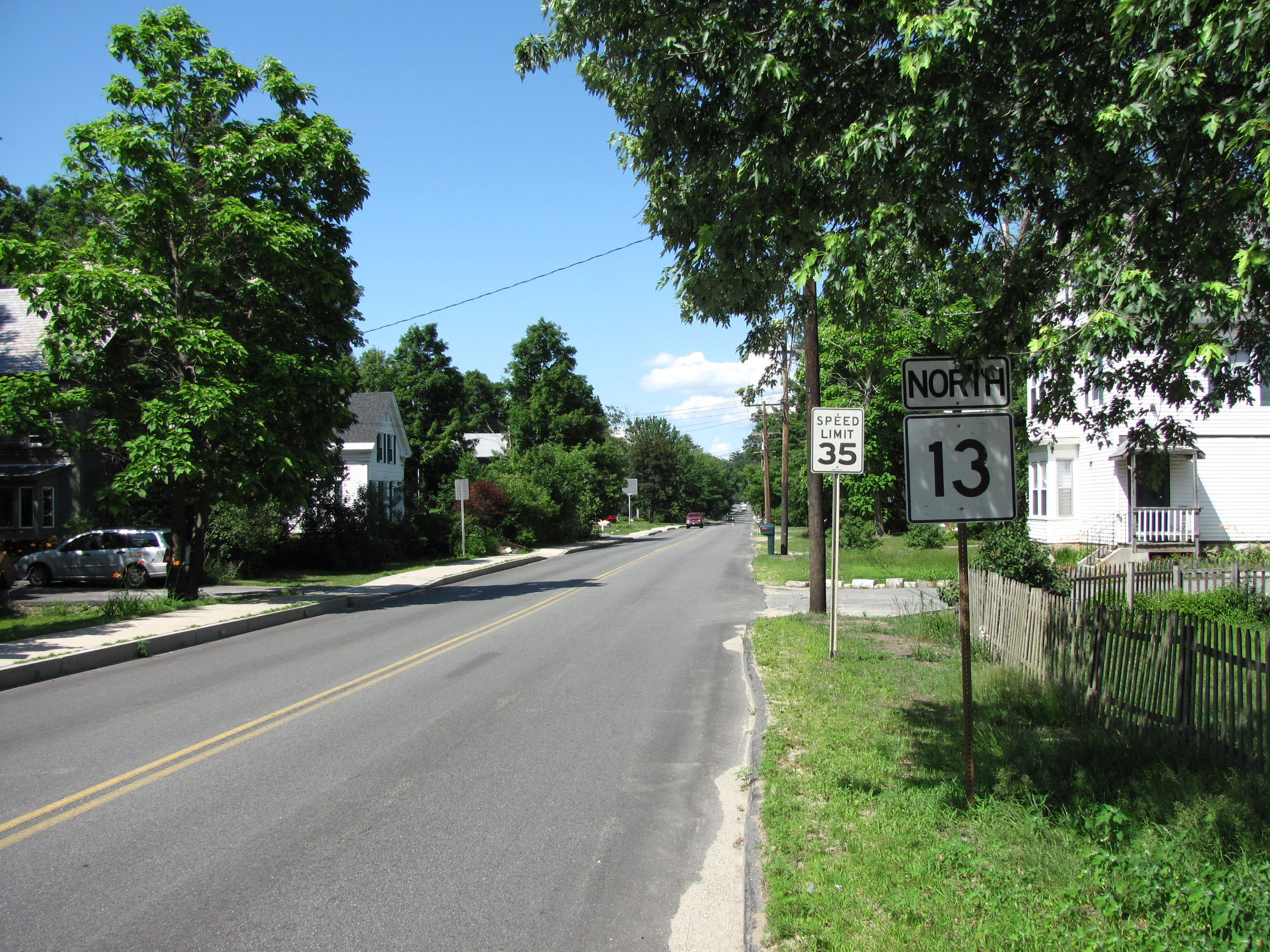
Rte. 13 northbound in Townsend

Route 13 begins at Route 12 north of downtown Leominster, where that route turns from Main Street to North Main Street. Route 13 continues along Main Street, crossing Route 2 near the Mall at Whitney Field, before crossing the north branch of the Nashua River and the Fitchburg Line of the MBTA Commuter Rail before turning northward towards the village of Whalom and the town of Lunenburg. In Lunenburg, the road turns eastward, running concurrently with Route 2A for approximately 0.3 miles (0.48 km) before turning northward again. It then passes into Townsend, where it crosses the Squannacook River and through the downtown area, before continuing through the Townsend State Forest and ending at the New Hampshire state line, where the road becomes New Hampshire Route 13, running northward towards Milford.

Whalom Park, a former amusement park which stood from 1893 to 2000, was located along Route 13 in Lunenburg, just north of the Leominster town line.

== Major intersections ==
County	Location	mi	km	Destinations	Notes
Worcester	Leominster	0.00	0.00	Route 12 to Route 117 – Sterling, Worcester, Fitchburg, Winchendon	Southern terminus
Worcester	Leominster	0.70	1.13	Route 2 – Concord, Boston, Athol, Greenfield	Exit 100 on Route 2; access via local roads
Worcester	Lunenburg	4.90	7.89	Route 2A west – Fitchburg, Westminster	Western terminus of concurrency with Route 2A
Worcester	Lunenburg	5.20	8.37	Route 2A east – Ayer, Littleton	Eastern terminus of concurrency with Route 2A
Middlesex	Townsend	10.90	17.54	Route 119 – Ashby, Rindge, NH, Pepperell, Groton	
Middlesex	Townsend	14.14	22.76	NH 13 north – Brookline	Continuation into New Hampshire
1.000 mi = 1.609 km; 1.000 km = 0.621 mi: Concurrency terminus
