= North Middlesex Regional School District =

School district in Massachusetts, United States

Location
- Townsend, Pepperell and Ashby Massachusetts; United States

District information
- Superintendent: Brad Morgan

Other information
- Website: www.nmrsd.org

North Middlesex Regional School District is an operating school district, located in the north/central section of Massachusetts on the New Hampshire/Massachusetts border, and serving the towns of Ashby, Pepperell and Townsend.

== Schools ==
=== High schools ===
- North Middlesex Regional High School (Townsend)

=== Middle schools ===
- Hawthorne Brook Middle School (Townsend, and Ashby)
- Nissitissit Middle School (Pepperell)

=== Elementary schools ===
- Spaulding Memorial School (Townsend)
- Varnum Brook Elementary School (Pepperell)

=== Special education/preschools ===
- Squannacook Early Childhood Center
