= Pearl Hill State Park =

State park in Middlesex County, Massachusetts

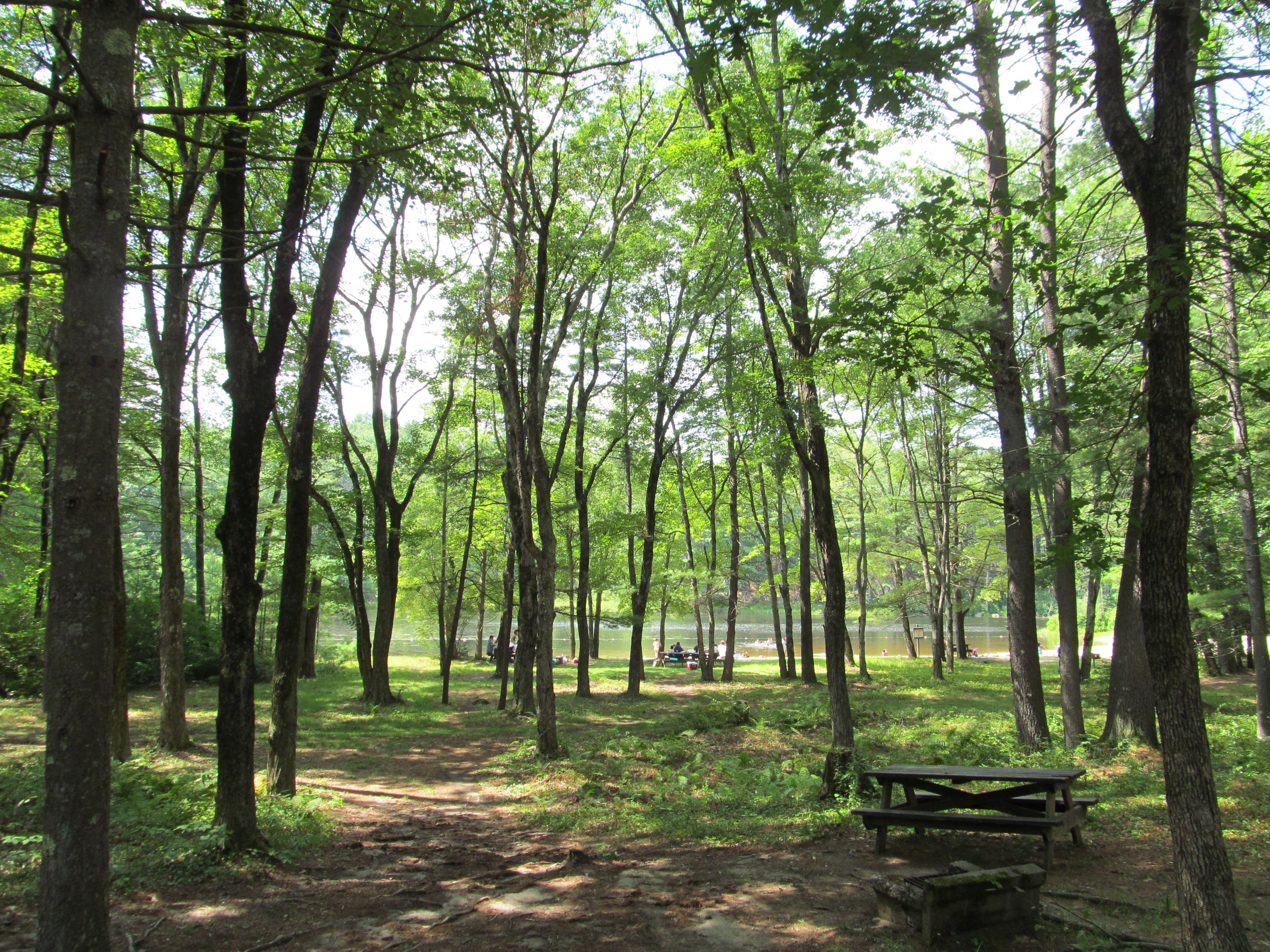

- Location within Massachusetts Location within the United States
- Location: Townsend, Massachusetts, United States
- Coordinates: 42°39′25″N 71°45′31″W
- Area: 1,000 acres (400 ha)
- Elevation: 387 ft (118 m)
- Administrator: Massachusetts Department of Conservation and Recreation
- Website: Official website

Pearl Hill State Park is a 1,000-acre (400 ha) Massachusetts state park located in the town of Townsend about 50 miles (80 km) from Boston. The park lies adjacent to Willard Brook State Forest and is managed by the Department of Conservation and Recreation.

== Activities and amenities ==
Park trails are used for hiking, mountain biking, cross-country skiing, and snowmobiling. A 4-mile (6.4 km) trail connects to Willard Brook State Forest. The park also offers campsites, a 5-acre (2.0 ha) pond with beach, picnicking, fishing, and interpretive programs.
