= Willard Brook State Forest =

Protected area in Massachusetts, United States

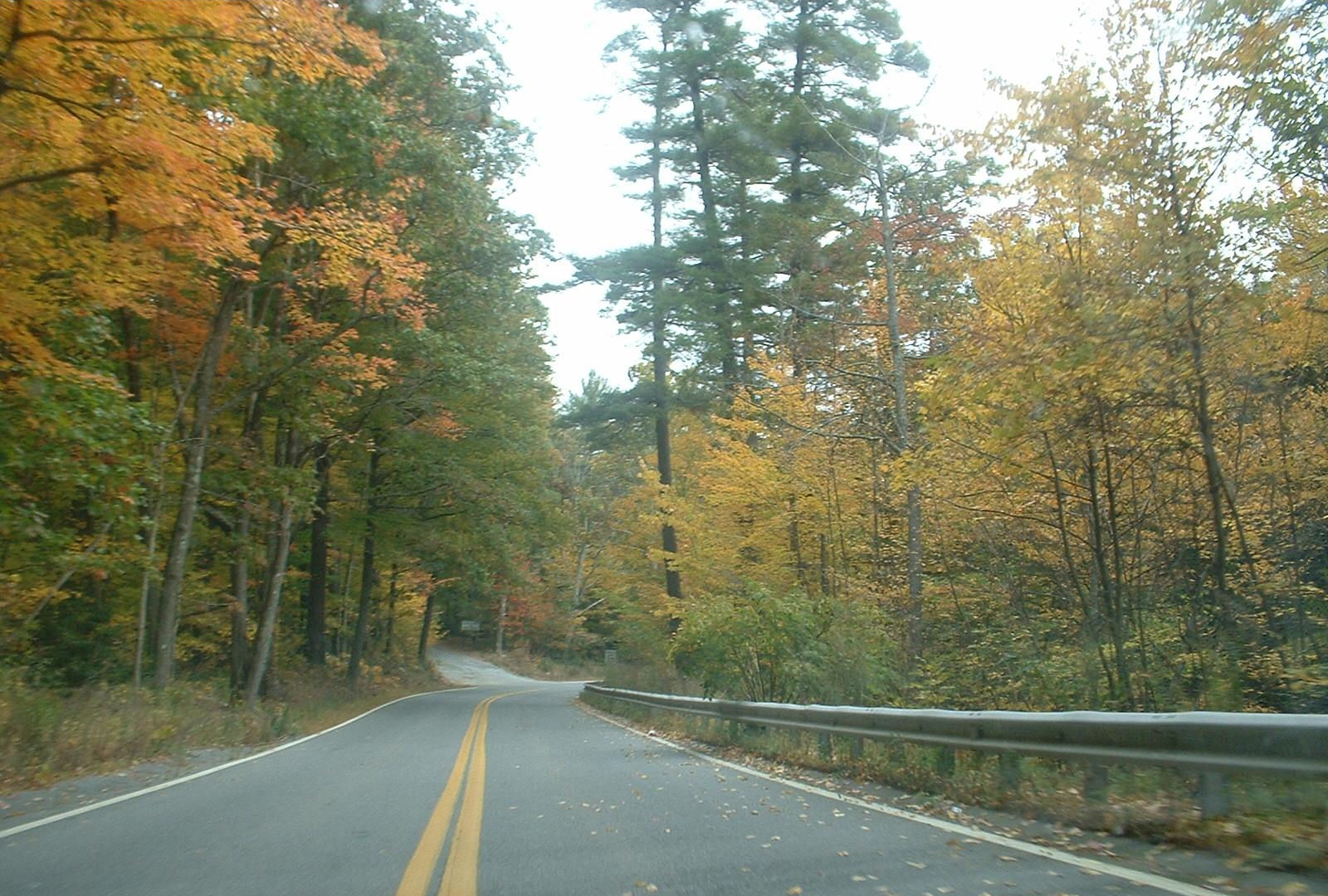
- Route 119 passing through Willard Brook State Forest

- Location within Massachusetts Location within the United States
- Location: Ashby and Townsend, Massachusetts, United States
- Coordinates: 42°39′25″N 71°45′31″W
- Area: 2,929 acres (1,185 ha)
- Elevation: 387 ft (118 m)
- Established: 1930
- Administrator: Massachusetts Department of Conservation and Recreation
- Website: Official website

Willard Brook State Forest is a publicly owned forest with recreational features located in the towns of Ashby and Townsend, Massachusetts. The forest's fast-running brook and tree stands of a classic New England nature give it a character more in line with that of the forests found farther west in the state. It is managed by the Department of Conservation and Recreation.

== History ==
The forest was established through state purchase of lands in 1930. While no Civilian Conservation Corps camp was established in this state forest, CCC workers from other areas were active here at various times from 1933 to 1940, developing recreational features at Damon Pond and Trap Brook Falls.

== Activities and amenities ==
Forest trails are available for hiking, horseback riding, mountain biking, cross-country skiing, and snowmobiling. The Friends Trail connects with the campground at Pearl Hill State Park. The forest also offers a campground, picnicking, swimming, fishing, and restricted hunting.
