= Pepperrell =

Pepperrell may refer to:

- Everett Pepperrell Wheeler (1840–1925), American lawyer, author, and politician
- Lady Pepperrell House, historic house on State Route 103 in Kittery Point, Maine, United States
- Pepperrell Air Force Base, U.S. military base in St. John's, Newfoundland, Canada from 1941 to 1960
- William Pepperrell (1696–1759), merchant and soldier in Colonial Massachusetts
- William Pepperrell House, historic house on State Route 103 (ME 103) in Kittery Point, Maine

== See also ==
- Pepperell (disambiguation)
- Paparella
