= Paparella =

Paparella is an Italian surname. Notable people with the surname include:

- Antonello Paparella, Italian food microbiologist
- Joe Paparella (1909–1994), American baseball umpire
- Raffaele Paparella (1915–2001), Italian comic artist and illustrator
