= John Kerin (umpire) =

American baseball umpire (1875-1946)

- Born: John Patrick Kerin; March 3, 1875; Townsend, Massachusetts, U.S.
- Died: March 16, 1946 (aged 71); Nashua, New Hampshire, U.S.
- Occupation: Umpire
- Years active: 1908-1910
- Employer: American League

John Patrick Kerin (March 3, 1875 – March 16, 1946) was an American professional baseball umpire. He umpired 265 American League games from 1908 to 1910. Kerin also umpired in the Eastern League and the Southern League from 1911 to 1920.

== Umpiring career ==
Kerin spent several seasons in the New England League and Eastern League before his major league service.

=== Notable games ===
After a September 1908 Chicago White Sox game, Kerin suffered a broken nose and was unconscious for a few minutes following a punch by an angry fan. The fan, attorney Robert Cantwell, was known locally for his defense of murder cases. Cantwell was later arrested for the assault.

== External Sources ==
- John Kerin at SABR Bio Project
