= Daniel Adams (physician) =

American physician and politician

- Born: September 29, 1773; Townsend, Province of Massachusetts, British America
- Died: June 6, 1864 (aged 90); Keene, New Hampshire, US
- Education: Dartmouth College (MD)
- Occupations: Physician; Politician
- Spouse: Nancy Mulliken
- Parents: Daniel Adams; Lydia Taylor Adams

Daniel Adams (September 29, 1773 – June 8, 1864) was a medical doctor, textbook writer, and state legislator. He was born in Townsend, Massachusetts to Daniel Adams and Lydia Taylor Adams in 1773.

He graduated from Dartmouth College in 1797, and received his M.D. in 1799. He married Nancy Mulliken in 1800, and began the practice of medicine in Leominster, Massachusetts that same year. He was chosen to deliver the eulogy for George Washington at the memorial service in Leominster. According to some accounts, this version was so popular that the town council had it printed and distributed free to the entire town. With Salmon Wilder he published the weekly newspaper Telescope from 1800 through 1802. Around 1805, he moved to Boston, Massachusetts, taught at a private school, and edited the monthly magazine Medical and Agricultural Register. In 1813, he moved to Mont Vernon, New Hampshire, and returned to the practice of medicine. He served in the New Hampshire Senate from 1838 through 1840. Later, in 1846, he moved to Keene, New Hampshire, where he remained until his death in 1864.

Adams compiled or wrote several different textbooks over the course of his life. His first was The Scholar's Arithmetic (1801). The text was very popular during the first quarter of the 19th century, and he published a revision of it, entitled Adam's New Arithmetic, in 1827. Much later in 1848, he published another mathematics textbook entitled Primary Arithmetic. He compiled three reading textbooks during his life, The Understanding Reader (1803), The Agricultural Reader (1824), and The Monitorial Reader (1841). He also wrote a grammar textbook The Thorough Scholar, or the Nature of Language (1802), a geography textbook Geography, or a Description of the World (1814), and an accounting textbook Bookkeeping (1849).
