= Herman Osman Stickney =

Herman O. Stickney
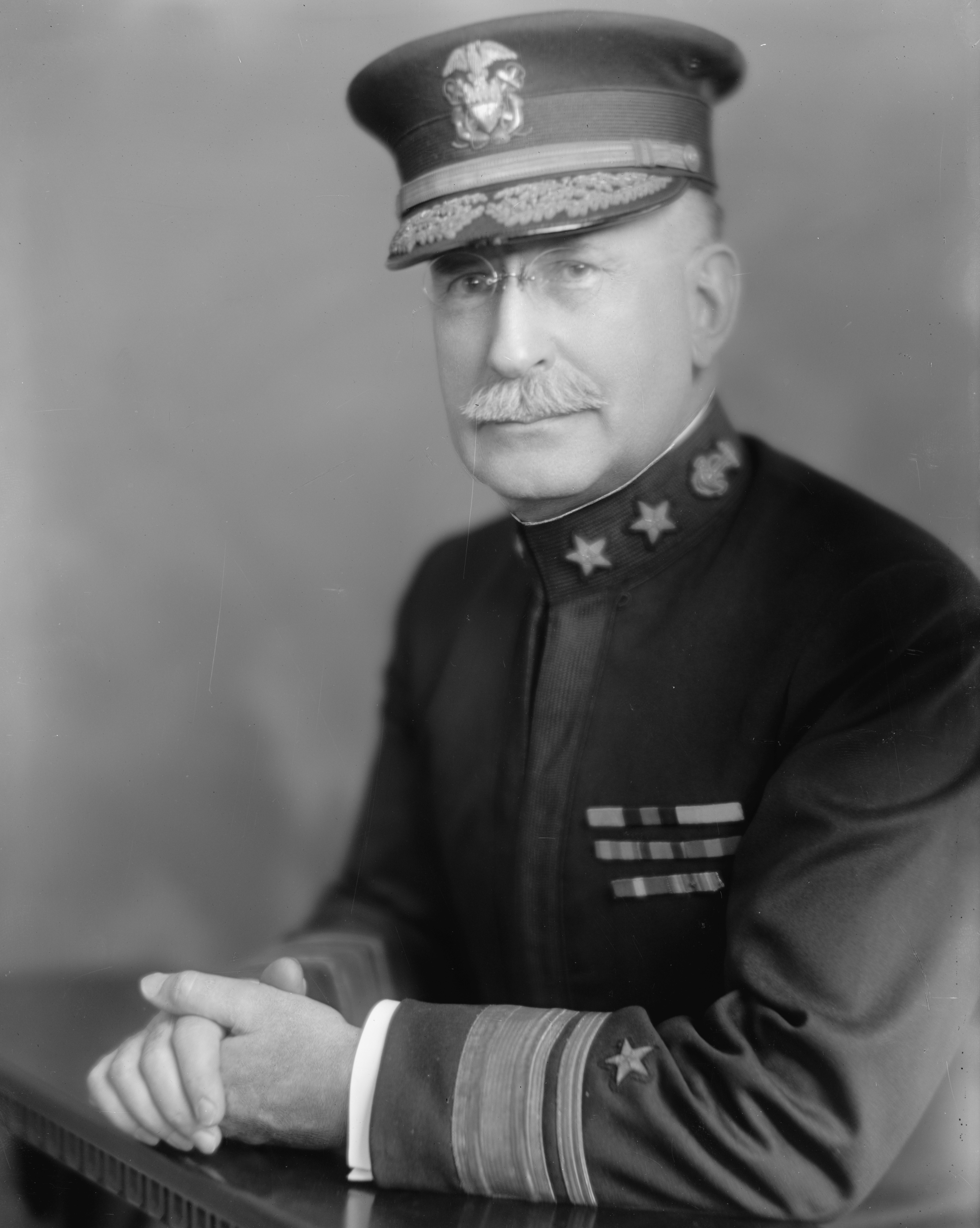
- Admiral Stickney
- Born: December 10, 1867; Pepperell, Massachusetts
- Died: September 13, 1936 (aged 68)
- Burial place: Arlington National Cemetery, Arlington, Virginia
- Military career
- Allegiance: United States of America
- Branch: United States Navy
- Service years: 1888–1921
- Rank: Rear Admiral
- Conflicts: United States occupation of Veracruz; Spanish–American War; Philippine–American War
- Awards: Medal of Honor; Navy Cross

Herman Osman Stickney (December 10, 1867 – September 13, 1936) was a Rear Admiral in the United States Navy who served in various capacities, including as Commander, Pacific Fleet at the end of his military career. Stickney was a recipient of the Navy Cross and the Medal of Honor.

== Biography ==
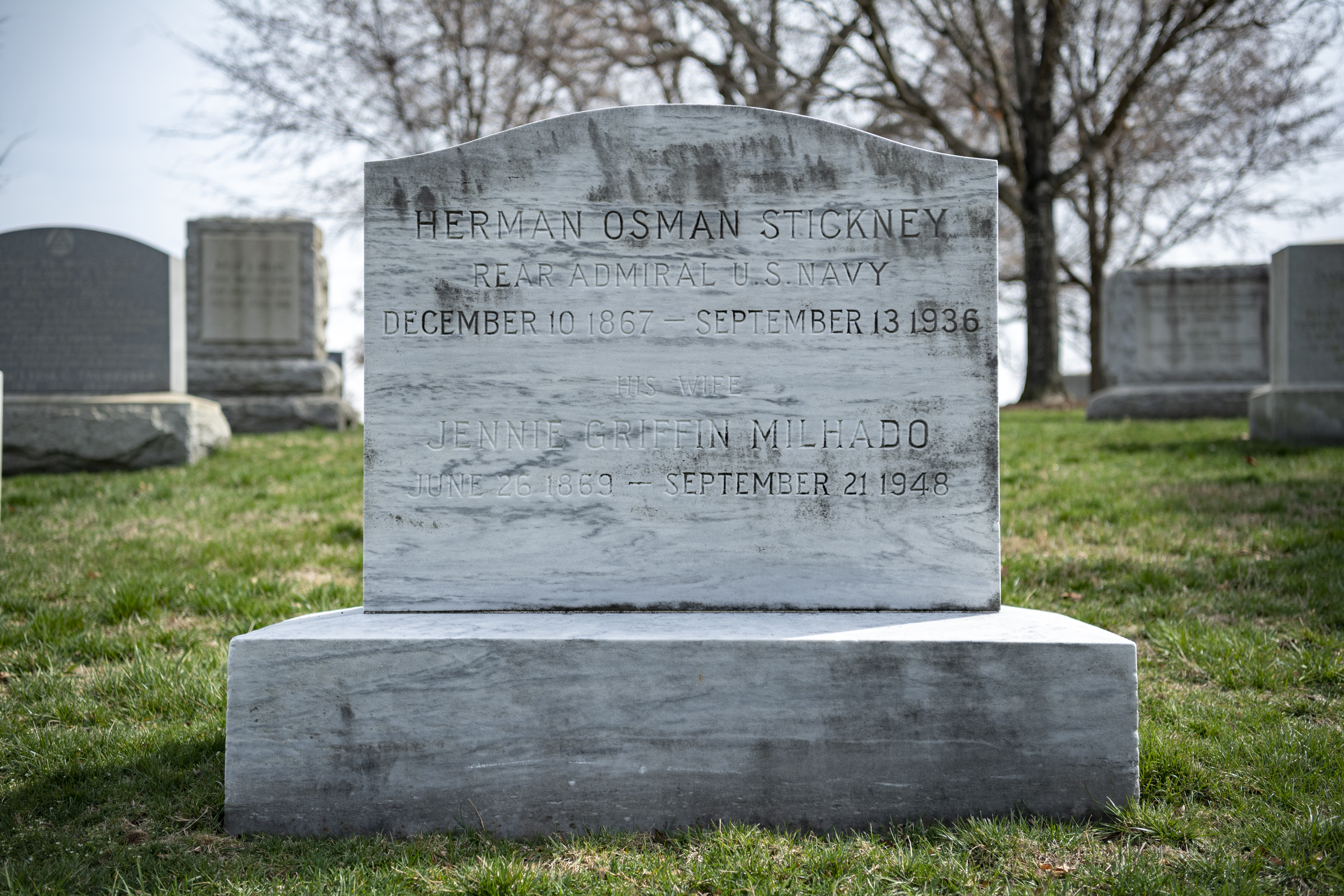
Grave at Arlington National Cemetery

Stickney was born on 10 December 1867 in Pepperell, Massachusetts, and graduated from the United States Naval Academy in 1888. He served aboard USS Iowa during the Spanish–American War and aboard USS Princeton during the Philippine–American War, and commanded USS Prairie at the United States occupation of Veracruz in 1914.

In an effort to force out General Victoriano Huerta, who had seized the presidency of Mexico in a bloody coup d' etat, President Woodrow Wilson sent three Navy vessels to Vera Cruz under the command of Rear Admiral Frank Friday Fletcher. On the morning of April 21 nearly 1,500 American combat troops were put ashore, and that night another 1,500 reinforcements landed. By noon on April 22 the American forces had taken control of the city. In the two-day action Fletcher lost 17 men killed, 63 wounded. The Mexicans had nearly 800 dead or wounded. Commander Herman Stickney commanded the guns of the U.S.S. Prairie, which provided covering fire for the initial landings on the first day, and continued to provide artillery support in the engagements of the second day of battle. His conduct and leadership insured that his batteries were effective in fulfilling their mission. Though the United States occupied Vera Cruz for seven months following the initial landing, the men who landed at Vera Cruz on April 21–22 accomplished their mission in two days, and returned to their vessels within the same week.

Stickney edited the 3rd revision of Naval Reciprocating Engines and Auxiliary Machinery, published in 1914 by the U.S. Naval Institute for use as a textbook at the Naval Academy.

Stickney served as a member of the Board of Inspection and Survey in 1918. His last Navy post was as Commander, Pacific Fleet. He retired from the Navy on 21 December 1921. Stickney died on 13 September 1936 and is buried in Section 3 of Arlington National Cemetery. Appointed Inspector of the Port of Vera Cruz, Mexico on 23 April 1914, Stickney later received the Medal of Honor for his actions at Veracruz on 21–22 April 1914.

== Medal of Honor citation ==
Citation:

The President of the United States of America, in the name of Congress, takes pleasure in presenting the Medal of Honor to Commander Herman Osman Stickney, United States Navy, for distinguished conduct in battle during the engagements of Vera Cruz, Mexico, 21 and 22 April 1914. Commander Stickney covered the landing of the 21st with the guns of the Prairie, and throughout the attack and occupation, rendered important assistance to our forces on shore with his 3-inch battery.

== See also ==
- List of Medal of Honor recipients (Veracruz)
