= Mary Catherine Chase =

American writer

Sister Mary Francis de Sales
- Born: Mary Catherine Chase; July 1, 1835 or July 1, 1836; Pepperell, Massachusetts
- Died: c. 1905
- Education: Mount Holyoke College; State Normal School
- Occupations: writer, Roman Catholic nun of the Order of the Visitation of Holy Mary
- Writing career
- Pen name: Winnie Rover; F. M. Edselas
- Language: English

Mary Catherine Chase (religious, Sister Mary Francis de Sales, of the Sisters of the Visitation; pen names, Winnie Rover and F. M. Edselas; 1835 – c. 1905) was a 19th-century American Catholic nun and writer. A fervent Episcopalian for years, she was later influenced by a Catholic woman and entered an enclosed order. Starting in 1874, she wrote under the pen name "Winnie Rover", switching to "F. M. Edselas" in 1892, when she became a frequent contributor of reminiscences of Ralph Waldo Emerson, Nathaniel Hawthorne, and other great writers.

== Early years and education ==
Mary Catherine Chase was born in Pepperell, Massachusetts, on July 1, 1835, or July 1, 1836. (Note: McBride notes July 1, 1835, while Wagenen notes July 1, 1836.) She had one sister, Sarah Augusta Chase (b. 1834). Chase lost her mother as an infant, and was raised by two maternal aunts. First home-schooled, she was later educated in the schools of Springfield, Massachusetts, at Mount Holyoke College, and at the State Normal School of Westfield, Massachusetts, from which she graduated in 1855.

At the age of 19, and under the spiritual guidance of Rev. Alexander Hamilton Vinton, D. D., she was confirmed in St. Paul's Church, Boston, and remained for years a fervent Episcopalian. She was a granddaughter of Bishop Philander Chase, and the only known member of the Chase family who later renounced Episcopalianism, after she became a Catholic and a nun.

== Career ==
Having chosen the vocation of a teacher, she drifted to the west. There she met a Catholic woman who influenced her. After entering an enclosed order, Chase took a religious name, but she also felt urged to contribute to literature for young Catholics, and using the pen name of "Winnie Rover", she published books of travel for children, the "Neptune Series", as well as several dramas, and various manuals for the classroom, notably Practical Science.

After 1892, using the pen name of "F. M. Edselas" – an anagram of her religious name, Mary Francis de Sales – she wrote upon subjects of public interest, giving the general impression that the writer was a man, writing such works as "How to Solve a Great Problem", "Institute of Woman's Professions", "Educational Bureau and Journal". The appearance of these articles in a leading Catholic periodical, and the favorable comment they received, resulted in her being chosen as one of the contributors to the Columbian Catholic Congress. Her paper was upon "Woman's Work in Religious Communities". Later, she gained new admirers in the literary world with, "A Visit to Ramona's Home", "In a City of the Clouds", "Constantine Zrumidl", and "What Shall We Do With Our Girls?"

She died c. 1905.

== Selected works ==
=== As Winnie Rover ===
- 1874, The Neptune outward bound
- 1877, The children of to-day : a farce in five acts
- 1877, Wealth and wisdom, a drama in six scenes
- 1877, The house on the avenue, or, The little mischief-makers : a drama in six scenes
- 1879, Lessons in practical science
- 1882, The Neptune at the Golden Horn
- 1890, The Neptune afloat

=== As F. M. Edselas ===
- In a City of the Clouds
- What Shall We Do with Our Girls?
- Mission Lectures to Non-Catholics
- An Educational Bureau and Journal, 1893
- The Wonders of Old Ocean
- The Golden Age and its People
- Checkmated Each Other
- Genoa and Its Campo Santo
- Savonarola--Monk, Patriot, Martyr
- Visit to Ramona's Home
- Institute for Woman's Professions
- Woman's Work in Religious Communities
- How to Solve a Great Problem
