= Pepperell, Massachusetts =

- Town
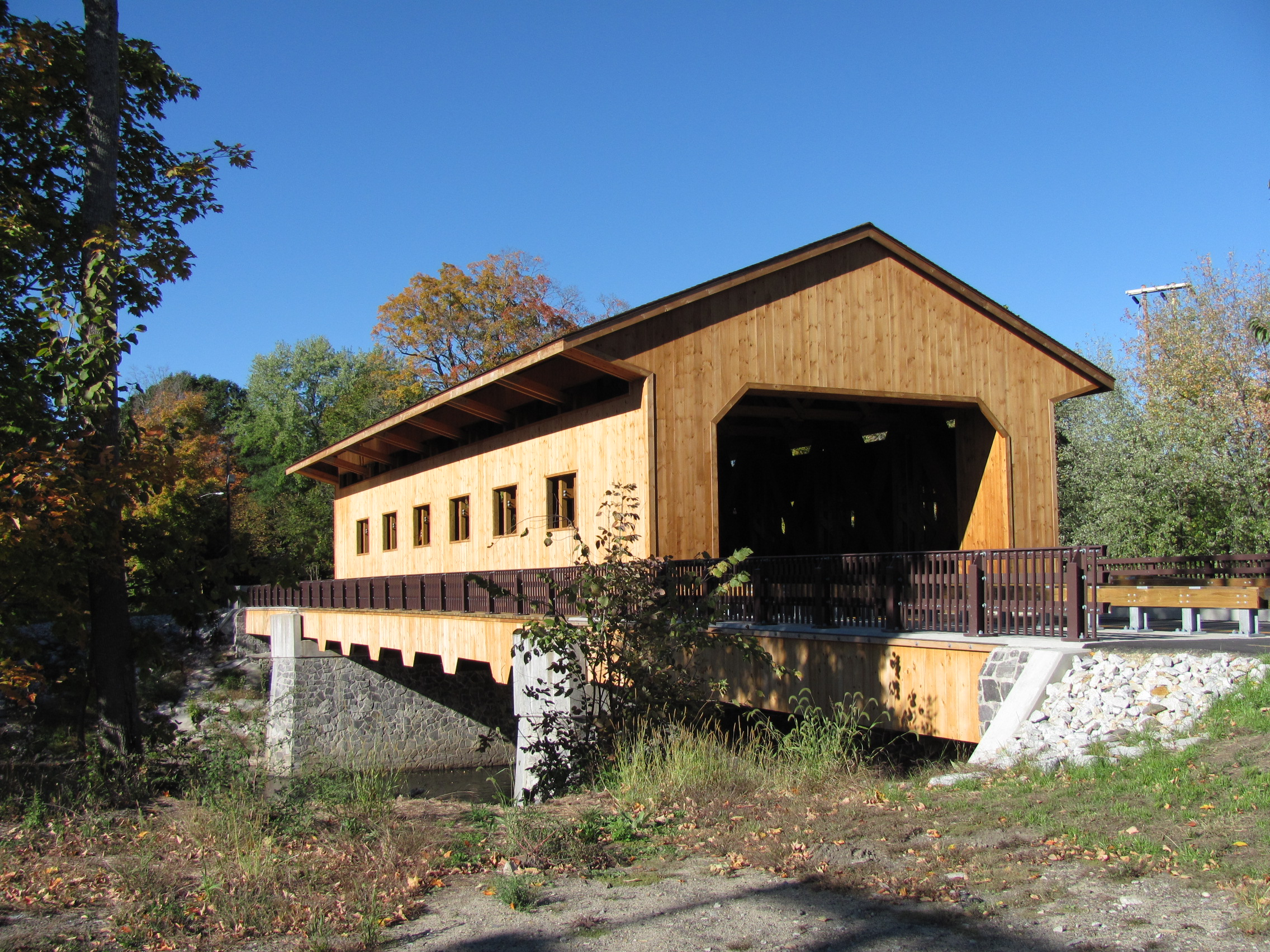
- Pepperell Covered Bridge

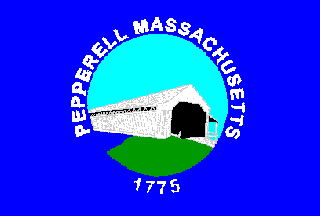
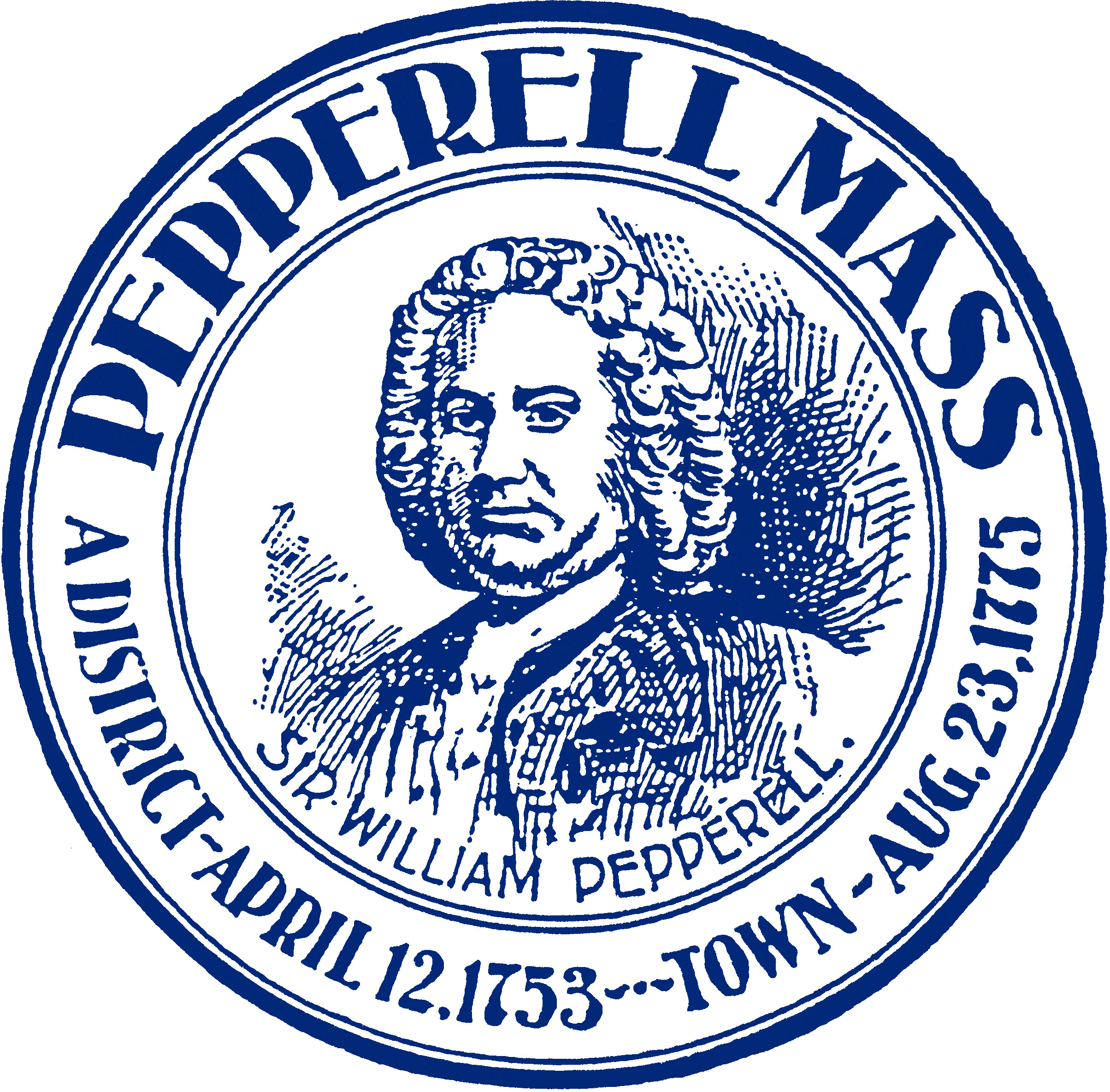
- Flag Seal

- Location in Middlesex County in Massachusetts
- Coordinates: 42°39′57″N 71°35′20″W
- Country: United States
- State: Massachusetts
- County: Middlesex
- Settled: 1720
- Incorporated: 1775
- Named for: Sir William Pepperrell

Government
  - Type: Open town meeting

Area
  - Total: 23.2 sq mi (60.0 km^{2})
  - Land: 22.5 sq mi (58.4 km^{2})
  - Water: 0.62 sq mi (1.6 km^{2})
- Elevation: 243 ft (74 m)

Population (2020)
  - Total: 11,604
  - Density: 515/sq mi (199/km^{2})
- Time zone: UTC-5 (Eastern)
  - Summer (DST): UTC-4 (Eastern)
- ZIP code: 01463
- Area code: 351 / 978
- FIPS code: 25-52805
- GNIS feature ID: 0618231
- Website: town.pepperell.ma.us

Pepperell is a town in Middlesex County, Massachusetts, United States. The population was 11,604 at the 2020 census. It includes the village of East Pepperell and census-designated place of Pepperell. Pepperell is home to the Pepperell Center Historic District, a covered bridge, and the 1901 Lawrence Library. The library has a collection of Sidney M. Shattuck's (1876–1917) stuffed birds.

== History ==
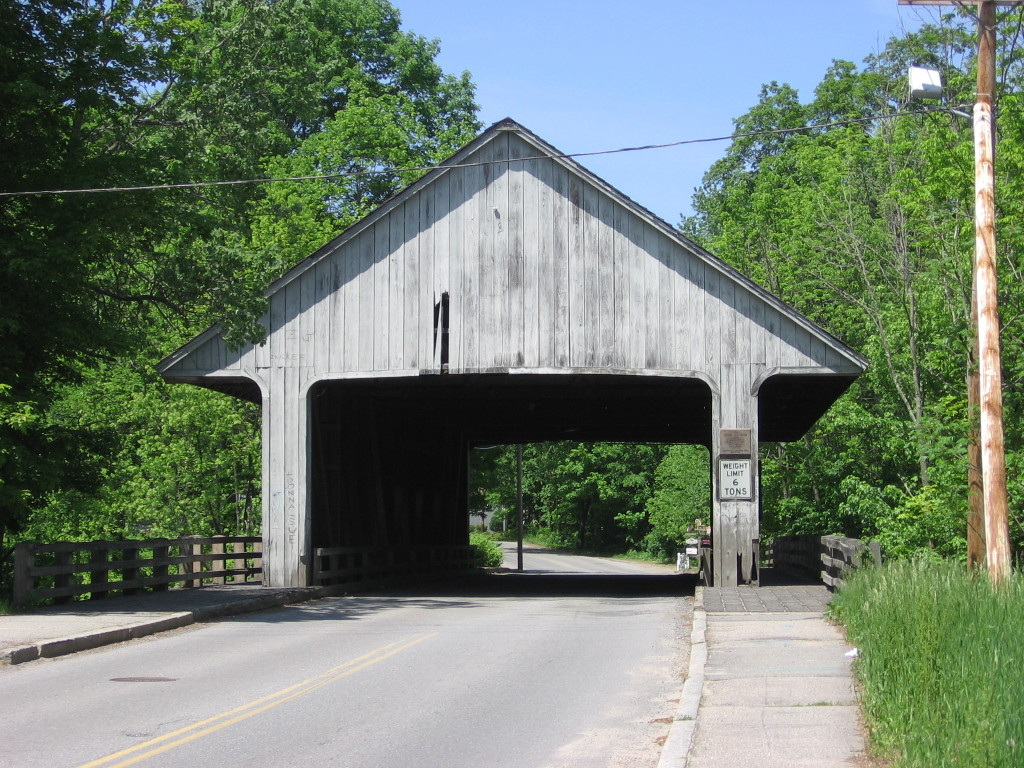
The old Pepperell covered bridge

Pepperell was first settled in 1720 as a part of Groton, and was officially incorporated as its own town in 1775. The founders named it after Sir William Pepperrell, a Massachusetts colonial soldier who led the Siege of Louisbourg during the French and Indian War. The town was noted for its good soil and orchards.

Since its formation, the town was active in the American independence movement. Being located northwest of Concord, Pepperell never saw British attack during the American Revolutionary War, though several Pepperell men fought at the Old North Bridge during the Battle of Concord, and a British spy was captured by women on guard at the site of the Pepperell covered bridge (see Prudence Wright). William Prescott, a resident of Pepperell, served as the commander at the Battle of Bunker Hill in what is now the Charlestown neighborhood of Boston.

By 1837, when the population was 1,586, Pepperell had three paper mills, one of which was managed by Warren F. Daniell. It also produced palm leaf hats, boots and shoes.

In 1848, the Worcester & Nashua Railroad was built through East Pepperell along the Nashua River as part of a through route from Worcester to Portland. In 1886 the line became part of the Boston & Maine Railroad, who continued to operate trains to Worcester and Nashua, as well as connections to Portland, Maine, and beyond.

Pepperell was also a station on the Boston & Maine's Milford Branch between Squannacook Junction and Milford, New Hampshire. In 1938, the Milford Branch was abandoned from Pepperell to South Milford. Trains continued to operate as far as Pepperell until 1941, when the tracks to Squannacook Junction were also abandoned, leaving Pepperell's paper mill without direct rail service. To correct this, a trestle bridge and rail connection were built from the B&M's WN&P line over the Nashua River, so that freights could still serve the mill.

Also in 1941, the WN&P line between Hollis, New Hampshire, and Nashua was abandoned; the railroad therefore renamed the remaining segment, from Ayer, Massachusetts, through East Pepperell, the "Hollis Branch". Freight service, primarily to the mill, was provided by the B&M with a local freight out of Ayer until 1981. The Hollis Branch was abandoned in 1982, mainly because of poor track conditions, and the tracks themselves were pulled up in 1984.

In 2001, what had been the railroad corridor was paved over to become part of the Nashua River Rail Trail.

The Pepperell town library, the Lawrence Library, was designed by architects Ernest Flagg and Walter B. Chambers, and built in 1901. On June 29, 2009, the people of Pepperell voted "yes" on a Proposition 2½ override, effectively saving operations of the Lawrence Library, Senior Center, and Community Center. The override helped fill a $1.3 million budget shortfall for fiscal year 2010.

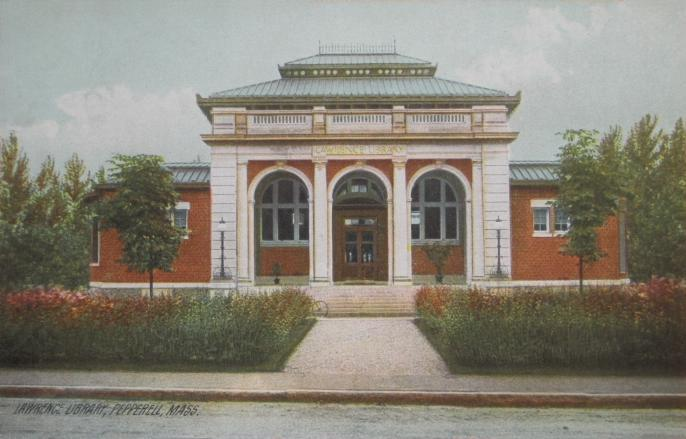
The Lawrence Library

One of only three covered bridges on public Massachusetts roads that are open to vehicular traffic (and the only one east of the Connecticut River) is on Groton Street in Pepperell. The current bridge officially opened on July 30, 2010, replacing the aging Chester H. Waterous Bridge which was closed to vehicles on April 7, 2008, and demolished beginning July 30, 2008. It took two years to build the new covered bridge.

== Geography ==
According to the United States Census Bureau, the town has a total area of 23.2 square miles (60.0 km^{2}), of which 22.6 square miles (58.4 km^{2}) is land and 0.6 square miles (1.6 km^{2}) (2.63%) is water. Pepperell is located at the confluence of the Nissitissit River with the Nashua River. According to the Pepperell Reader, the town is situated on a long extinct volcano that helped shape much of New England's geology.

Pepperell borders Brookline and Hollis, New Hampshire to the north, Dunstable to the east, Groton to the south, Townsend to the west, and Nashua, New Hampshire to the northeast via the Nashua River.

Pepperell is served by state routes 111, 113 and 119.

== Demographics ==
Historical population
Year	Pop.	±%
1790	1,132	—
1850	1,754	+54.9%
1860	1,895	+8.0%
1870	1,842	−2.8%
1880	2,348	+27.5%
1890	3,127	+33.2%
1900	3,701	+18.4%
1910	2,953	−20.2%
1920	2,468	−16.4%
1930	2,922	+18.4%
1940	3,114	+6.6%
1950	3,460	+11.1%
1960	4,336	+25.3%
1970	5,887	+35.8%
1980	8,061	+36.9%
1990	10,098	+25.3%
2000	11,142	+10.3%
2010	11,497	+3.2%
2020	11,604	+0.9%
2023*	11,710	+0.9%
* = population estimate. Source: United States census records and Population Estimates Program data.

As of the census of 2010, there were 11,497 people, 3,847 households, and 3,016 families residing in the town. The population density was 495.6 inhabitants per square mile (191.4/km^{2}). There were 4,348 housing units at an average density of 187.4 per square mile (72.4/km^{2}). The racial makeup of the town was 95.61% White, 0.56% Black or African American, 0.04% Native American, 1.07% Asian, 2.71% from other races. Hispanic or Latino of any race were 2.25% of the population.

There were 3,847 households, out of which 44.2% had children under the age of 18 living with them, 65.5% were married couples living together, 9.6% had a female householder with no husband present, and 21.6% were non-families. Of all households 17.4% were made up of individuals, and 6.0% had someone living alone who was 65 years of age or older. The average household size was 2.89 and the average family size was 3.29.

In the town, the population was spread out, with 30.6% under the age of 18, 6.1% from 18 to 24, 33.0% from 25 to 44, 22.7% from 45 to 64, and 7.5% who were 65 years of age or older. The median age was 35 years. For every 100 females, there were 96.8 males. For every 100 females age 18 and over, there were 93.6 males.

The median income for a household in the town was $82,055, and the median income for a family was $97,870. The per capita income for the town was $35,144. About 2.0% of families and 3.7% of the population were below the poverty line, including 2.8% of those under age 18 and 8.0% of those age 65 or over.

== Education ==
Pepperell is a part of the North Middlesex Regional School District, along with Ashby, and Townsend. Students in Pepperell attend Varnum Brook Elementary School for elementary school, and Nissitissit Middle School for middle school, and high school students attend North Middlesex Regional High School.

== Recreation ==
- Nashua River Rail Trail (bicycling, running, and walking)
- Pepperell Town Field

(town fairs, firework shows, basketball, skateboarding)

== Notable people ==
- Joseph Breck, horticulturist
- Henry Adams Bullard, U.S. Congressman from Louisiana
- Mary Catherine Chase, nun, writer
- Barbara Cooney, writer and illustrator of children's books, awarded Caldecott Medal
- John Wesley Emerson, founder of Emerson Electric Company
- Herbert W. Levi, Professor of Zoology Harvard University, international expert on spiders, January 3, 1921 – November 3, 2014
- Barzillai Lew, African-American Revolutionary War soldier
- William Prescott, American Revolution Colonel, led forces at the Battle of Bunker Hill
- William Prescott, Jr., representative from Massachusetts for the Hartford Convention
- Katherine Hancock Ragsdale, president and dean of the Episcopal Divinity School
- Edward Parmelee Smith, co-founder of Fisk University and other historically black colleges
- Herman Osman Stickney, U.S. Navy Admiral, recipient of the Medal of Honor
- Hermon F. Titus, radical newspaper publisher and Socialist Party factional leader
- John Traphagan, Professor of Anthropology University of Texas, international expert on Japan, author
- Wayne Winterrowd, gardening expert and designer
- Prudence Wright, patriot, detained a British spy at Jewetts bridge
