= Ashby, Massachusetts =

- Town
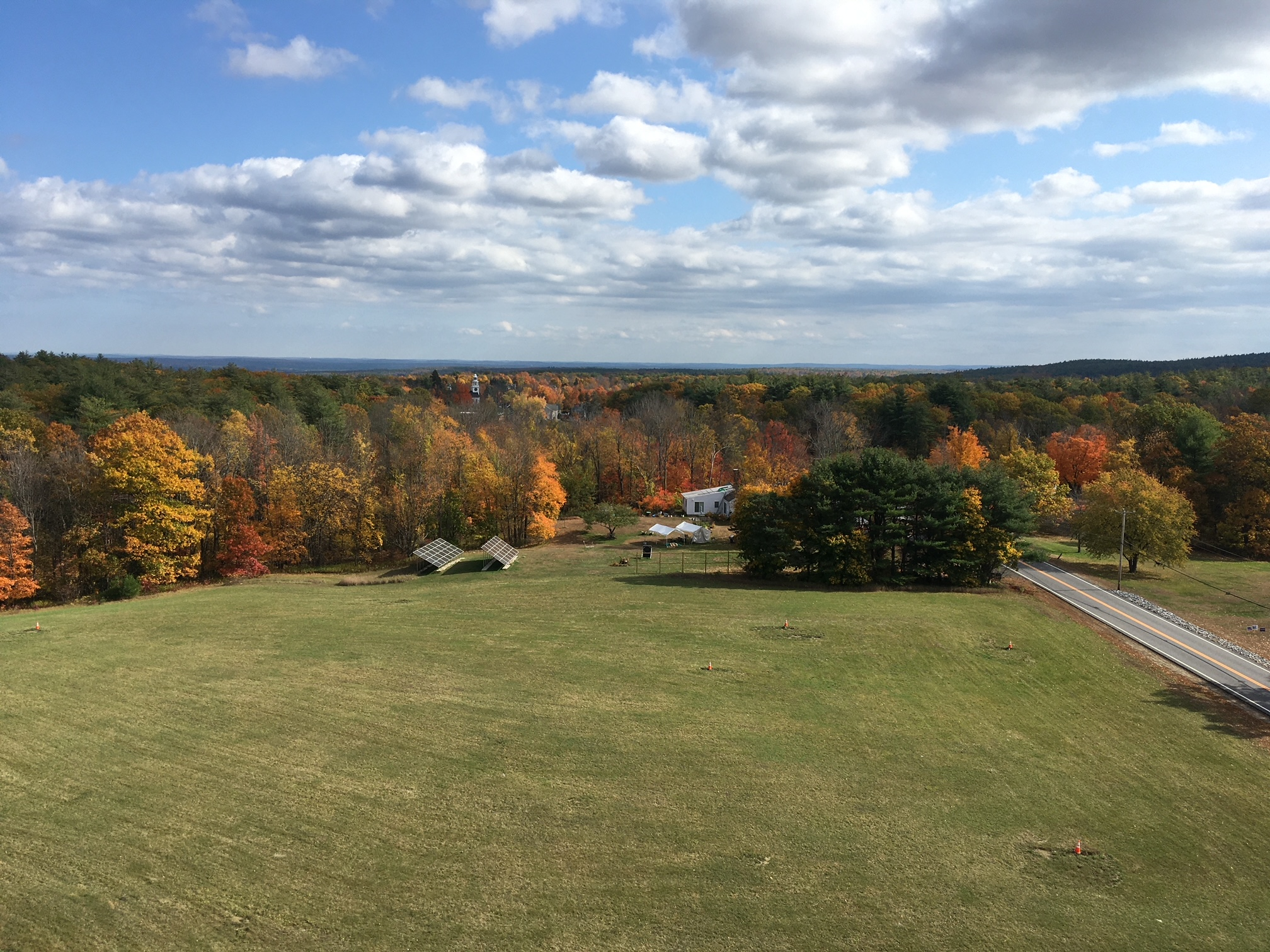
- Ashby, looking toward the center of town (taken prior to the construction of the public safety building)

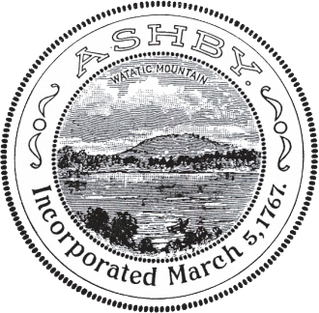
- Flag Seal

- Location in Middlesex County in Massachusetts
- Coordinates: 42°40′40″N 71°49′15″W
- Country: United States
- State: Massachusetts
- County: Middlesex
- Settled: 1676
- Incorporated: 1767

Government
  - Type: Open town meeting
  - Town Administrator: Mary Daughraty

Area
  - Total: 24.2 sq mi (62.6 km^{2})
  - Land: 23.8 sq mi (61.6 km^{2})
  - Water: 0.39 sq mi (1.0 km^{2})
- Elevation: 906 ft (276 m)

Population (2020)
  - Total: 3,193
  - Density: 134/sq mi (51.8/km^{2})
- Time zone: UTC−5 (Eastern)
  - Summer (DST): UTC−4 (Eastern)
- ZIP Code: 01431
- Area code: 351/978
- FIPS code: 25-01955
- GNIS feature ID: 0618214
- Website: https://www.ashbyma.gov/

Ashby is a town in Middlesex County, Massachusetts, United States. The population was 3,193 at the 2020 census, which makes it the least populous municipality in Middlesex County. Ashby is primarily a bedroom community, consisting almost entirely of single family homes and a limited number of businesses.

Ashby is also host to a large portion of the Willard Brook State Forest, including Damon Pond, Trap Falls, and numerous miles of hiking trails.

== Geography ==
According to the United States Census Bureau, the town has a total area of 24.2 square miles (63 km^{2}), of which 23.8 square miles (62 km^{2}) is land and 0.4 square miles (1.0 km^{2}) (1.53%) is water.

Ashby is bordered by New Ipswich, New Hampshire and Mason, New Hampshire to the north, Townsend to the east, Lunenburg to the southeast, Fitchburg to the south, and Ashburnham to the west. Situated at the northwestern corner of Middlesex County, Ashby is the only town in Middlesex County that does not border more than one other town in the same county.

== Transportation ==
Route 31 runs north–south through Ashby, and Route 119 runs east–west. The two routes have a short overlap to the east of the town center.

Ashby is a member of the Montachusett Regional Transit Authority (MART), but there is no direct public transportation to the town beyond paratransit services; the nearest service is in the city of Fitchburg, to the south.

== Demographics ==
Historical population
Year	Pop.	±%
1790	751	—
1850	1,208	+60.9%
1860	1,091	−9.7%
1870	994	−8.9%
1880	914	−8.0%
1890	825	−9.7%
1900	876	+6.2%
1910	885	+1.0%
1920	834	−5.8%
1930	982	+17.7%
1940	1,026	+4.5%
1950	1,464	+42.7%
1960	1,883	+28.6%
1970	2,274	+20.8%
1980	2,311	+1.6%
1990	2,717	+17.6%
2000	2,845	+4.7%
2010	3,074	+8.0%
2020	3,193	+3.9%
2022*	3,163	−0.9%
* = population estimate. Source: United States census records and Population Estimates Program data.

At the 2010 census, there were 3,074 people, 1,105 households and 862 families residing in the town. The population density was 129.2 inhabitants per square mile (49.88/km^{2}). There were 1,191 housing units at an average density of 50.0 per square mile (19.3/km^{2}). The racial makeup of the town was 97.1% White, 0.4% African American, 0.2% Native American, 0.3% Asian, 0.4% from other races, and 1.6% from two or more races. Hispanic or Latino of any race were 1.9% of the population.

There were 1,060 households, of which 34.1% had children under the age of 18 living with them, 66.5% were married couples living together, 0.9% had a male householder with no wife present, 6.7% had a female householder with no husband present, and 25.8% were non-families. 12.8% of all households were made up of individuals, and 5.9% had someone living alone who was 65 years of age or older. The average household size was 2.86 and the average family size was 3.20.

Of the 3,074 people in the population, 24.5% were under the age of 18, 8.0% were 15 to 19 years of age, 4.6% were 20 to 24 years of age, 22.7% were 25 to 44 years of age, 35.6% were 45 to 64 years of age, and 10.5% were 65 years and over. The median age was 42.6 years. For every 100 females, there was 101.0 males. For every 100 females 18 years and over there were 102.0 males.

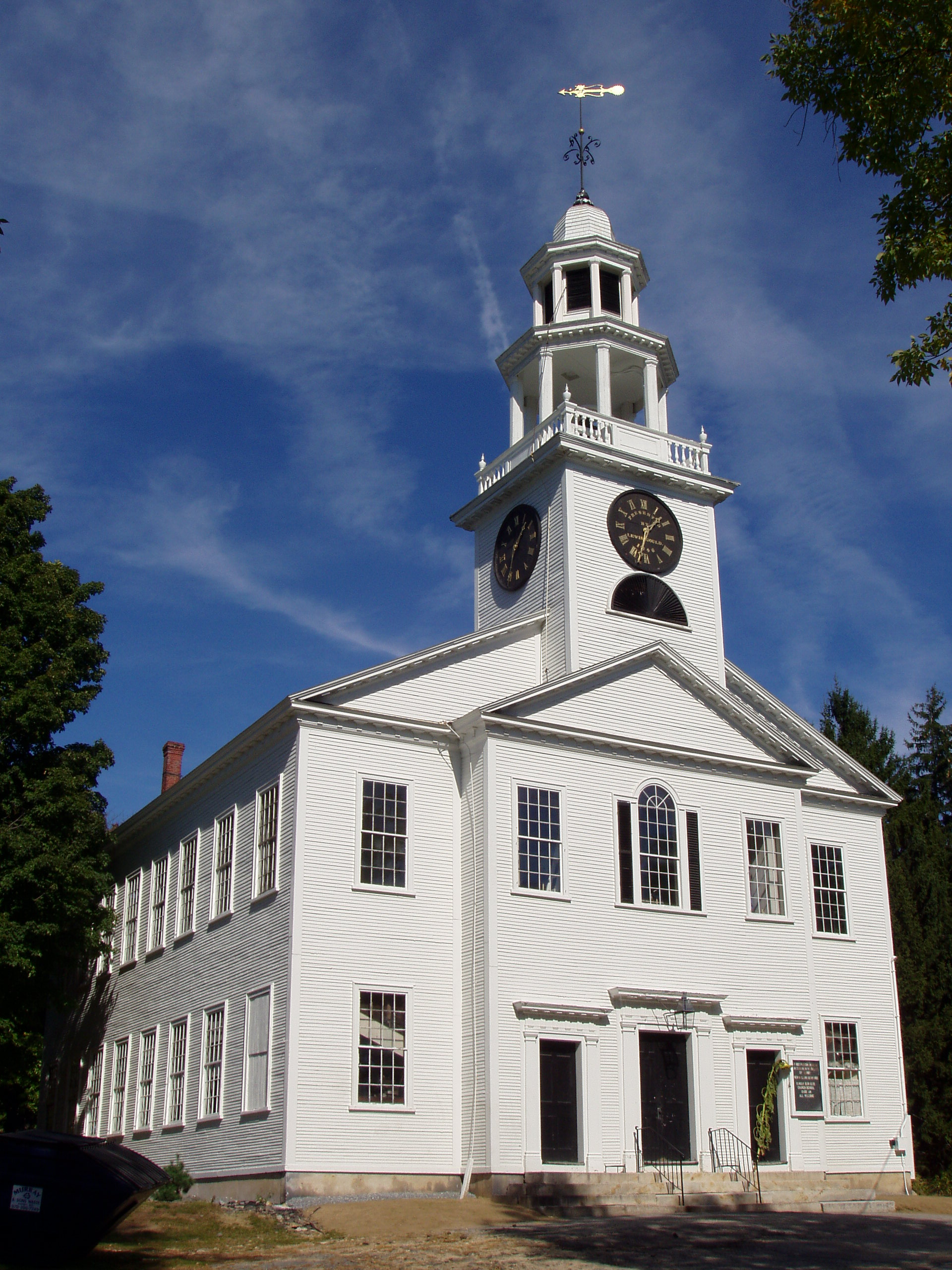
First Parish Church (Unitarian Universalist), built in 1809 as the town's meetinghouse to a pattern by architect Asher Benjamin

The median household income was $82,614, and the median family income was $84,655. The median income of individuals working full-time was $62,355 for males versus $44,511 for females. The per capita income for the town was $32,434. About 0.9% of families and 4.0% of the population were below the poverty line, including 0.0% of those under age 18 and 5.0% of those age 65 or over.

== History ==
=== Background ===
Ashby was first settled in 1676 and was officially incorporated in 1767. The town was formed from portions of Townsend, Lunenburg, Fitchburg, and Dorchester-Canada (a portion of Ashburnham). One of the earliest settlers of the town was John Fitch. Fitch was kidnapped by Native Americans in 1748 and was held hostage for six months. Fitch died in 1795 with his surviving children remaining in the community. The John Fitch Monument, known to most at the "monument", is located at the intersection of South and Richardson roads, stands to this day and was recently cleaned up by volunteers in 2021. Though some mills existed in the town, the community remained primarily an agricultural one with the majority of land being used for farming in the 1700s and 1900s. Ashby was at one time home to numerous apple orchards, the remnants of which can be found in the woods behind present day houses.

=== Places of Interest ===
==== Historical Society ====
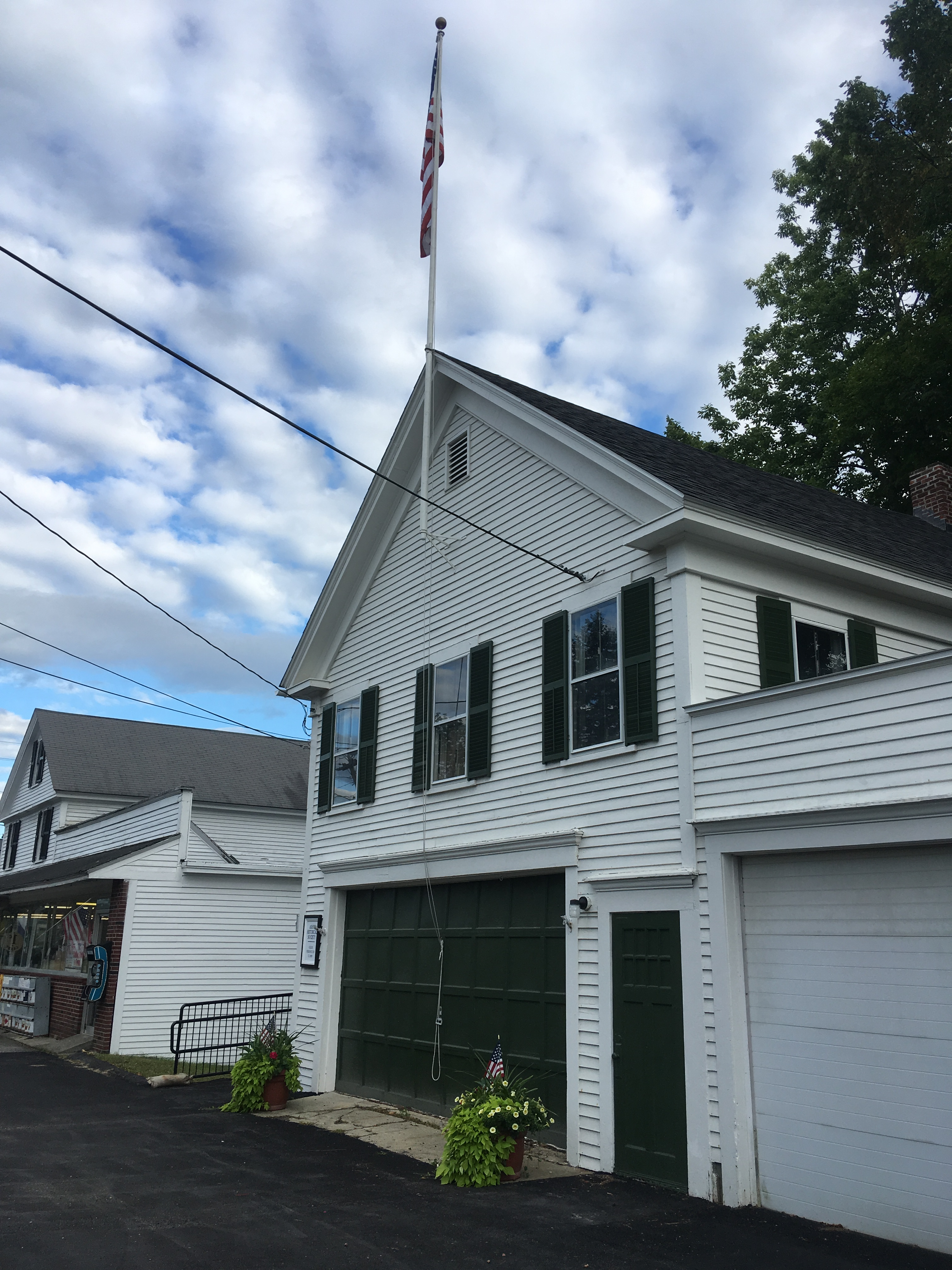
Old Engine House - This building is the current home of the Ashby Historical Society. Over the years this building has been used as a police station, 911 dispatch center, and fire station.

The Ashby Historical Society was formed in 1900 with a goal of preserving Ashby's history for future generations. The group maintains and curates a small museum in the old engine house, located in the center of town that was originally constructed circa 1899. The society maintains a collection of artifacts from the town's history and continues to add donations and found artifacts to its collections. This collection of artifacts includes maps, books, letters, furniture, farm implements, firefighting apparatus, and much more. Hand pumped fire apparatus are on display at the historical society, along with fire related tools.

==== "The Town Pump" ====
The Town Pump, a newsletter published during the final two years of World War II, had its first edition published in June 1944 and last in September 1945. The Town Pump circulated as a means of keeping residents temporarily out of town supporting the war effort informed on that which was happening at home. The news letter circulated during 1944 and 1945, until publication ceased with the end of the war. Scanned digital copies of "The Town Pump" can be found online.

==== The Ashby Stock Farm ====
The Ashby Stock Farm, also known as the Middlesex Stock Farm, is situated on the largest parcel of contiguous open space remaining in town today. The farm consists of 238 acres of hay fields and forestland. The farm once stretched all of the way into downtown and up to the New Hampshire border. The farm has had several owners and was once a large dairy operation. The farm is currently privately owned and has horses and active hay production on the property.

==== Gazebo and Town Common ====
The Ashby town common is a familiar sight for anyone traveling through town on Route 119. The common is a moderately sized triangular parcel of land in the center of town, just at the crest of the hill in front of one of two remaining historic churches. The common was once shaded by several maple trees, many of which have since died and been removed. The gazebo stands where it has since the 19th century and was restored in the 2000s.

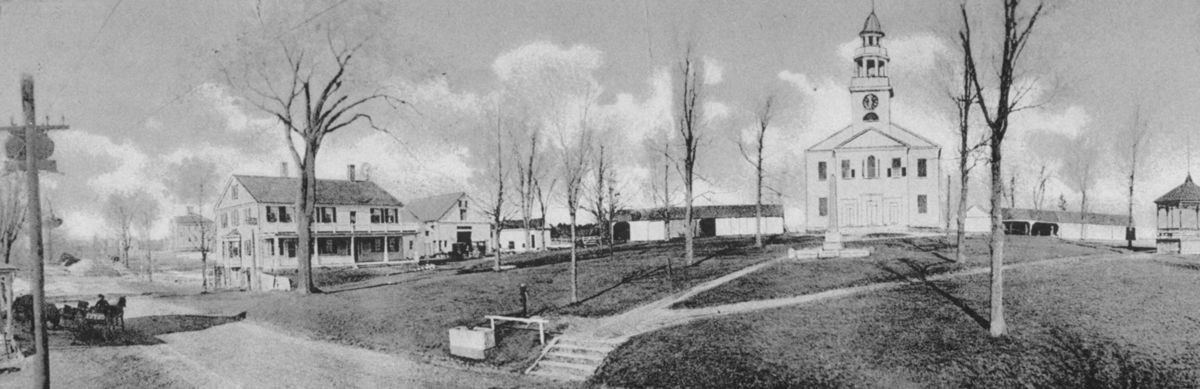
Ashby Common, 1900s

==== South Village (Mill Village) ====
The South Village area, also referred to on some historic maps as the "Mill Village", is the area surrounding the outlet of the Ashby Reservoir. This small section of town was home to a gristmill and some limited mill housing that was constructed by Ephraim Hayward circa 1800. There are two buildings that still exist to this day on the property now owned by Middlesex County Foundation. The property remains in operation by Camp Middlesex as a seasonal 4-H camp. The mill buildings, dam and bridge have been maintained over the years with the bridge over the spillway being replaced in the 2000s. The mills changed hands multiple times during their operation, eventually being operated by William O. Loveland, who continued to run the sawmill and retrofitted the gristmill to produce electricity. Loveland is believed to have been the person to convince the Board of Selectmen to construct poles and run electric power to light the center of town around 1902. The mills were eventually closed in the 1920s.

==== Cemeteries ====
Ashby contains three historic cemeteries located through the town.

The First Parish Burial Ground, also referred to as the "Old Burial Ground", was established on the common in 1767.

Glenwood cemetery is newer than all of the towns other cemeteries and was constructed in 1867.

West cemetery, originally a family burial ground started during the Revolutionary War, was later used in the 20th century by many Finnish families. This cemetery, as are the others, is now owned and maintained by the town.

==== Watatic Ski Area ====
Mount Watatic, located in the towns of Ashburnham and Ashby, was once home to a small ski area that operated from the 1930s until its closure in 1984. The ski area started with a small rope tow and expanded to the summit some time later, thought to be in the 1960s. At its height, the ski area had snow making and night skiing, impressive features at the time. The area also included multiple rope tows, two T-bars and double chairs that eventually replaced the old rope tows and one T-bar. In 1984, the ski area eventually succumbed to competition and its poor location in relation to major roads. There was one attempt to reopen the ski area in 1988, under the name Ski Adventure that was ultimately unsuccessful. The land of the former ski area is currently held in conservation and is accessible to the public for hiking. Hikers can find the old, grown-in trails and remnants of the area's structures still visible on the back side of the mountain.

Mount Watatic was also once home to state fire tower #31 that looked out over central Massachusetts at an elevation above sea level of 1590 feet. Phone lines to the tower ran up the Ashby and Ashburnham sides of the mountain over the years.

=== Recent History ===
==== 250th Parade and Celebration ====
The Ashby 250th celebration in 2017 featured a year long schedule of events including a parade, tour of the historical society, ecumenical camp meeting, horse demonstrations, old fashion baseball game, bonfire, and several other events.

=== Other ===
The majority European-American town gained national attention in 1973 when the Ashby Town Meeting voted 148 to 79 against inviting non-white people to live there.

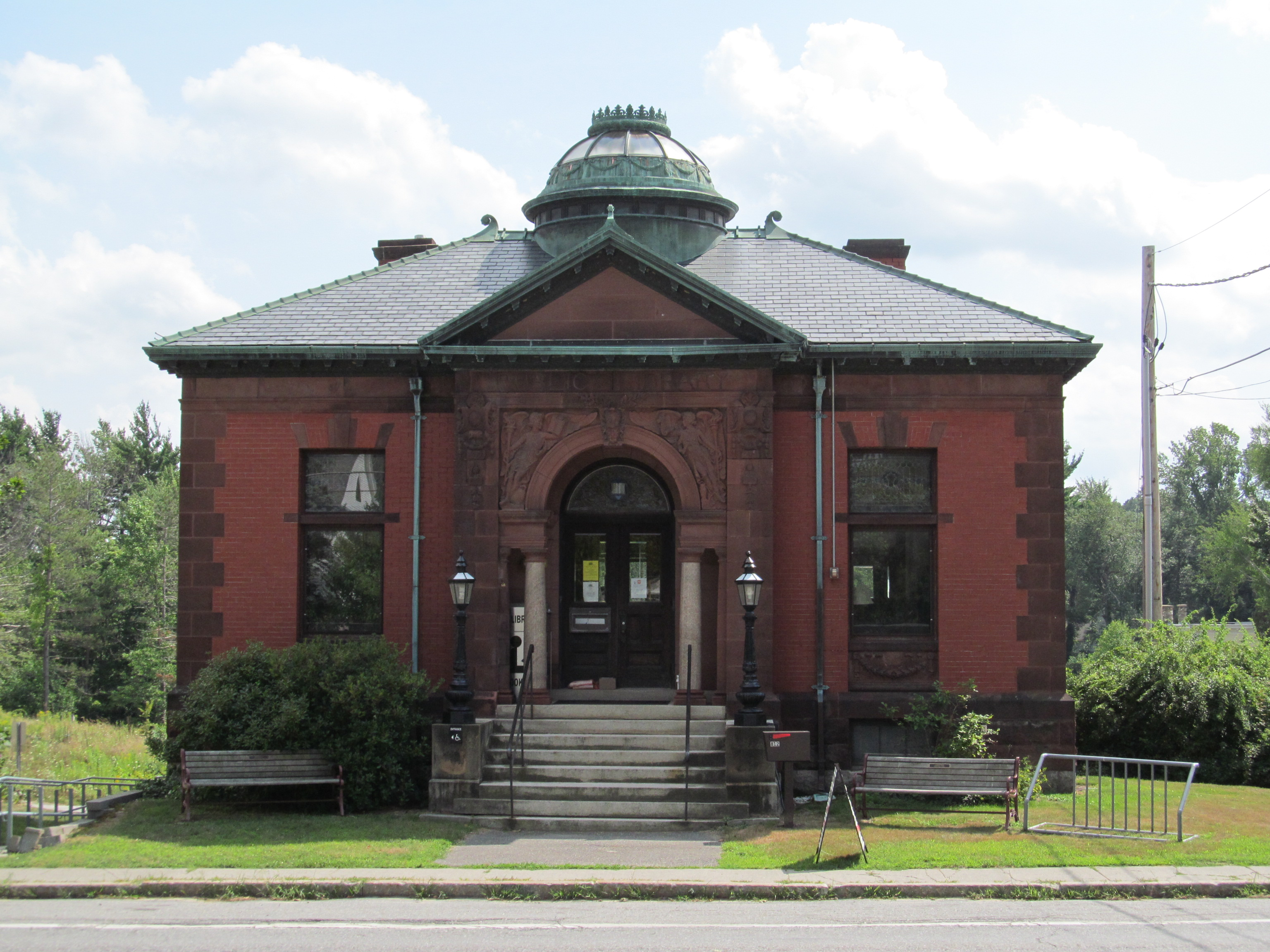
Ashby Free Public Library

== Ashby Free Public Library ==
The library is a public library, founded in 1874 "largely through the efforts of Rev. George S. Shaw." In the 1890s it was "kept in a private house" open to the public Tuesday and Friday afternoons. Around 1890 the Ashby library had "1,584 volumes, with which its inhabitants have a pleasant and profitable acquaintance."

In 1901 businessman and Civil War veteran Edwin Chapman donated a new building, which opened in 1902.

In the early 2000s, Ashby's historic library received a large expansion and interior renovation, utilizing a "passive solar" building technique, and serving as a model library to Massachusetts Board of Library Commissioners (MBLC) on the same.

== Education ==
Ashby is a member town of North Middlesex Regional School District, along with Pepperell, and Townsend. It once had its own elementary school, Ashby Elementary School until it was closed in 2025. Middle School students attend Hawthorne Brook Middle School, and high school students attend North Middlesex Regional High School.

== State Forest ==
The Town of Ashby is home to a large portion of the Willard Brook State Forest managed by the Massachusetts Department of Conservation and Recreation. Willard Brook contains 2,597 acres of land of varied terrain. The state forest property has facilities for camping, cooking, swimming and picnicking available. Info about the forests operating hours and amenities can be found on the Commonwealth of MA Website.

=== Damon Pond ===
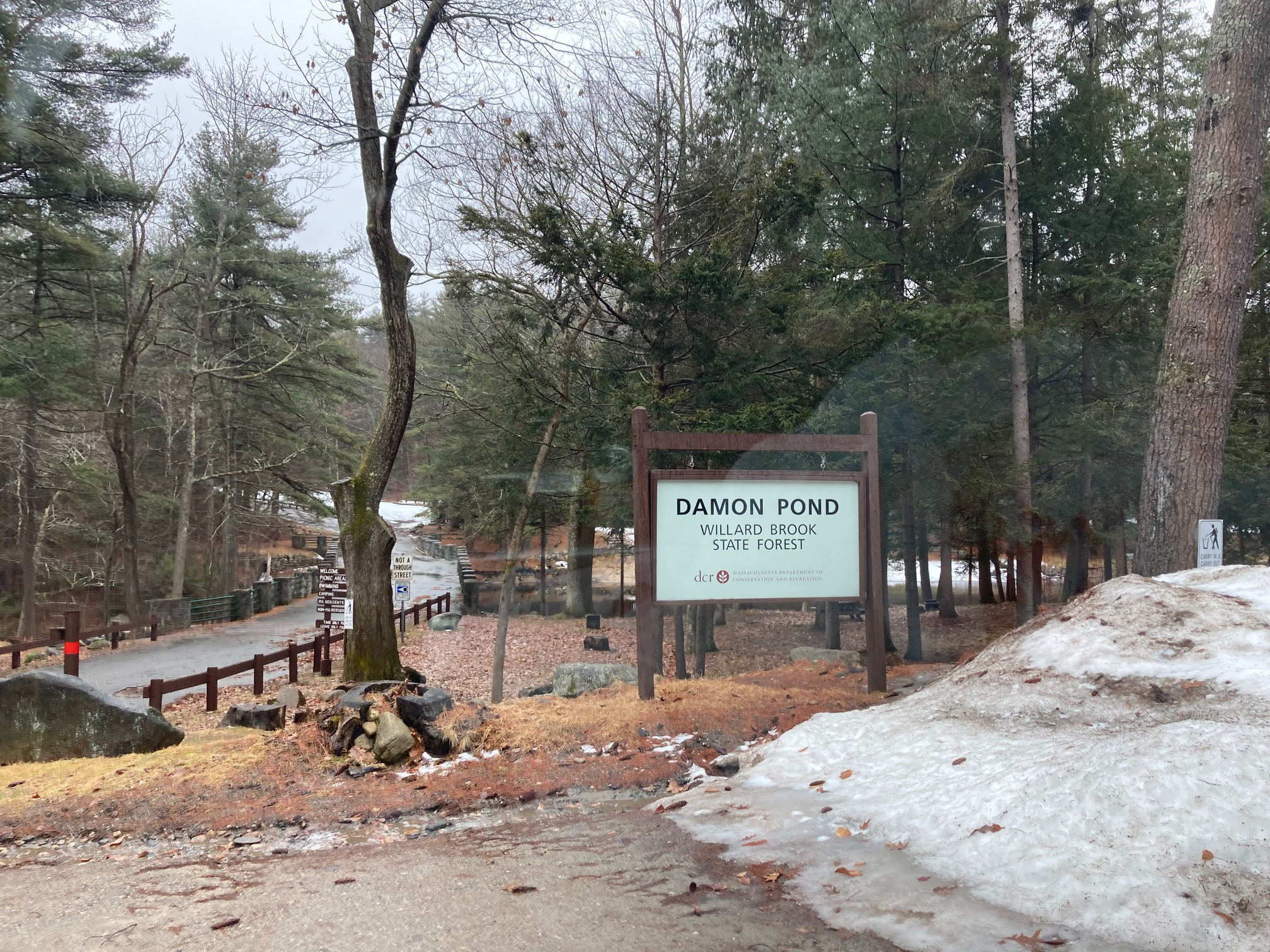
Damon Pond sign on Route 119 in Ashby

Damon Pond is a man-made swimming pond that was constructed, along with several other features of the state forest property, by the CCC sometime between 1933 and 1940. The pond was created by an area of Willard Brook that is impounded by a dam.

=== Hiking Trails ===
The forest contains several hiking trails, horseback riding, and mountain biking. In the winter, the forest plays host to cross country skiing and snowmobiling. Many trails are groomed and maintained by local snowmobile groups in the winter to ensure safe and easy access to the trails.

The Friends and Family Loop Trail, a walking trail suitable for all ages, is four miles long and connects to the Pearl Hill State Forest.

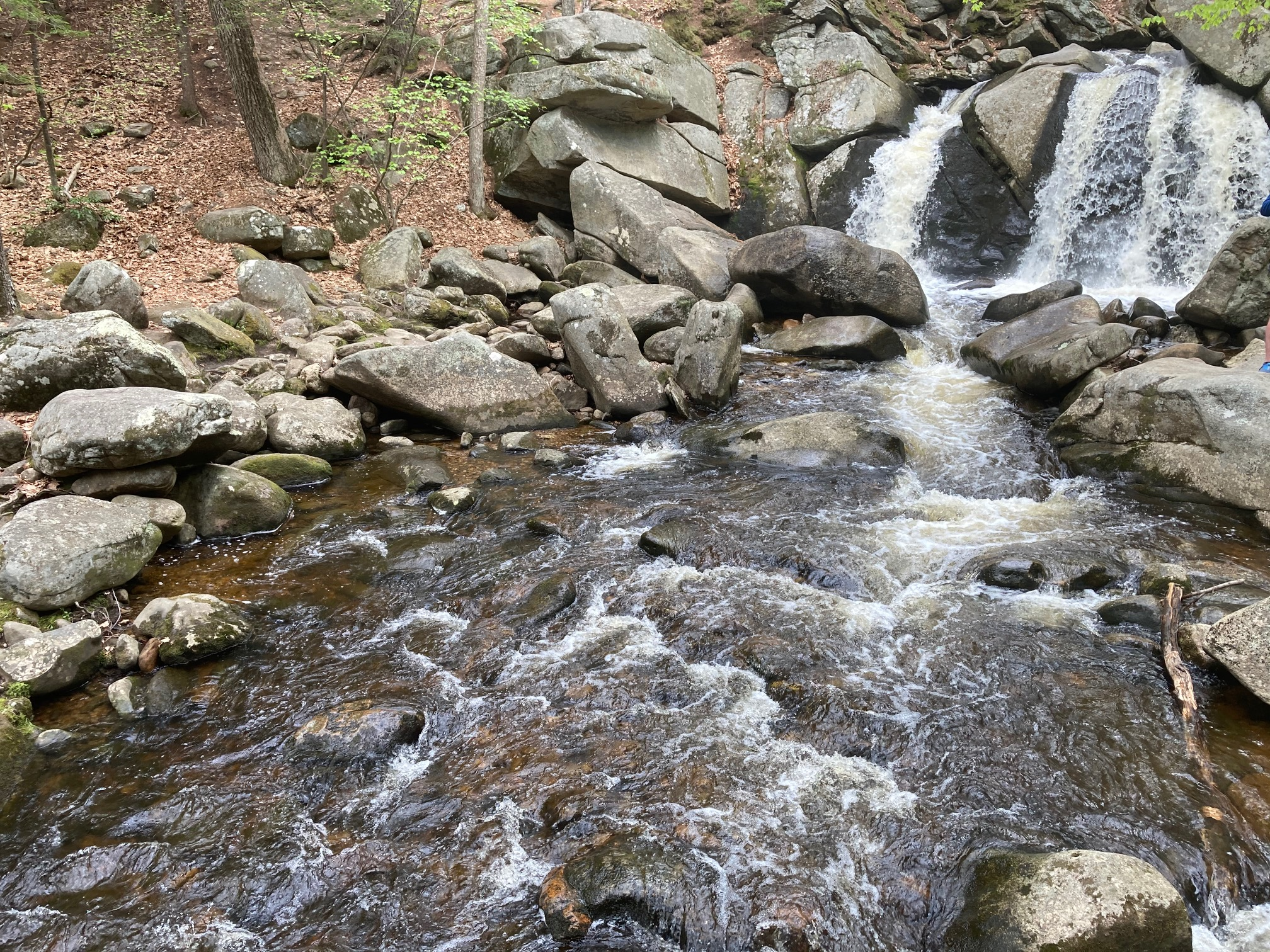
Trap Falls located in the Willard Brook State Forest along Massachusetts Route 119

=== Trap Falls ===
A waterfall located in the Willard Brook State Forest with a height of between 10 and 12 ft. The ferocity of the falls is dependent on the time of year, with the highest flows being in the spring and early summer.

The falls is supplied by Trap Fall Brook, that starts near the New Hampshire border and runs southeast and eventually joins Willard Brook after crossing under Route 119.

The falls is a short walk from the parking area located along Route 119. A walking bridge is located at the base of the falls, providing access to the opposite side.

== Local events ==
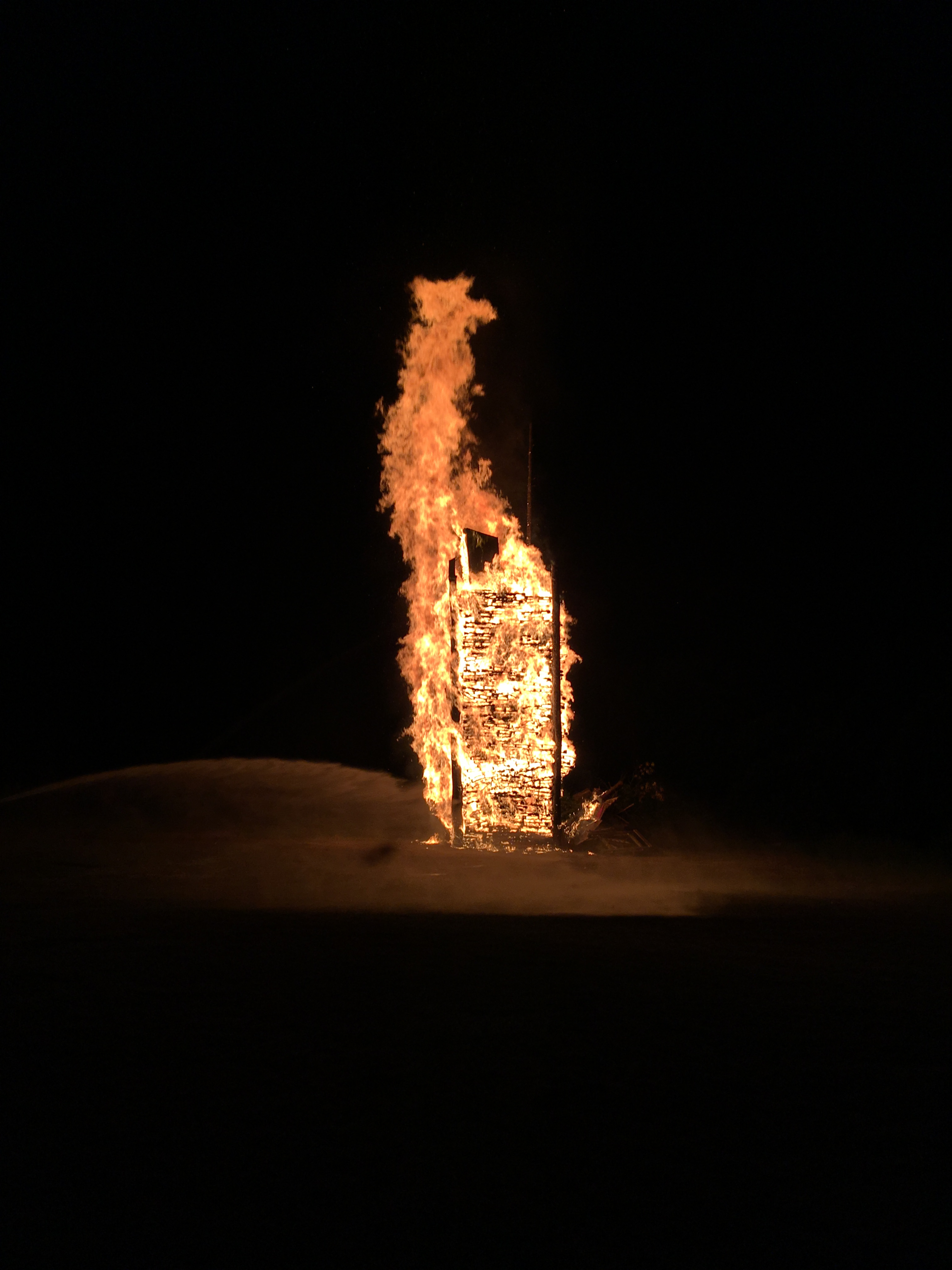
Ashby Bonfire in 2019

The small town of Ashby hosts several community events each year.

- Ashby July 3 Bonfire
- Summer Night Band Concerts on The Common (July – August)
- 911 Ceremony
- Winter Holiday Band Concert
- Farmers Markets on The Common
- Annual Car Show For Veterans
- Pumpkin Festival and Tractor Parade
- Memorial Day Parade
- Halloween Downtown Trick or Treat

== Fire Department ==
The Ashby Fire Department located at 1093 Main Street, Ashby, provides fire protection, rescue and EMS (Emergency Medical Services) to the town. The department is made up of a combination of paid, on-call, and volunteer personnel that serve the community. Other services include permitting, inspections, community service, and CPR classes. The department's fire apparatus consist of three fire engines, one tanker, one forestry, a chief's car, utility pickup and two UTV's. The department has two ambulances, at 2018 Dodge PL Custom and a 1999 Ford F450 Road Rescue that operate at the BLS level.

== Police and Fire Departmenta ==
The Ashby Police Department (APD) is responsible for law enforcement and criminal investigations in Ashby, Massachusetts. The department consists of a Chief of Police, a Sergeant, and five full-time Patrolmen.

Both the Ashby Police Department and the Ashby Fire Department are housed in the new Public Safety complex at 1093 Main Street. This state-of-the-art facility was approved by town voters and constructed in 2018–2019.

Additionally, the town has merged dispatch services with Patriot Dispatch, resulting in cost savings and a successful integration.

== Notable persons ==
- Lisa Anne Fletcher (1844–1905), poet, artist and correspondent
- Aldrich Bowker (1875–1947), actor, stage and screen
- Lemuel Shattuck (1793–1859), educator, politician, historian, bookseller, and publisher
