= Pepperell Center Historic District =

Historic district in Massachusetts, United States

- U.S. National Register of Historic Places
- U.S. Historic district
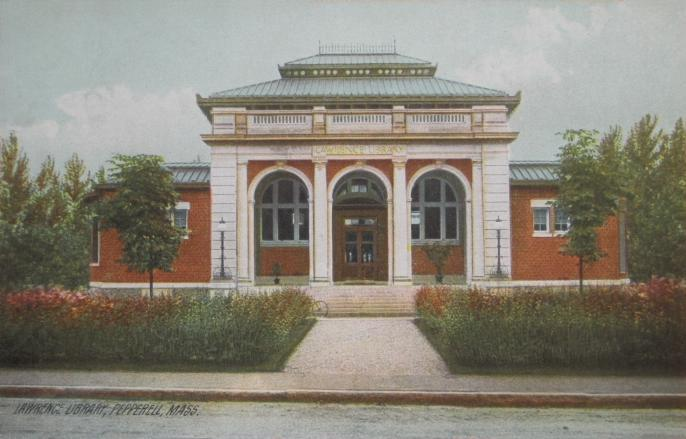
- Lawrence Library

- Location within Massachusetts Location within the United States
- Location: Pepperell, Massachusetts
- Coordinates: 42°40′1″N 71°35′55″W
- Built: 1746
- Architect: Ernest Flagg, others
- Architectural style: Colonial, Greek Revival, Late Victorian
- NRHP reference No.: 94000812
- Added to NRHP: August 5, 1994

The Pepperell Center Historic District encompasses the historic core of the village center of Pepperell, Massachusetts. The district is based around the town common, which was laid out in 1740, along with the construction of the first church (whose location is demarcated by foundation lines). It includes a number of surviving 18th-century structures, including a post office building that is now a private home, and the town's oldest cemeteries. The village radiates away from the common along Park, Main, Elm, Townsend and Heald Streets.

The district was added to the National Register of Historic Places in 1994.

== See also ==
- National Register of Historic Places listings in Middlesex County, Massachusetts
