= North Middlesex Regional High School =

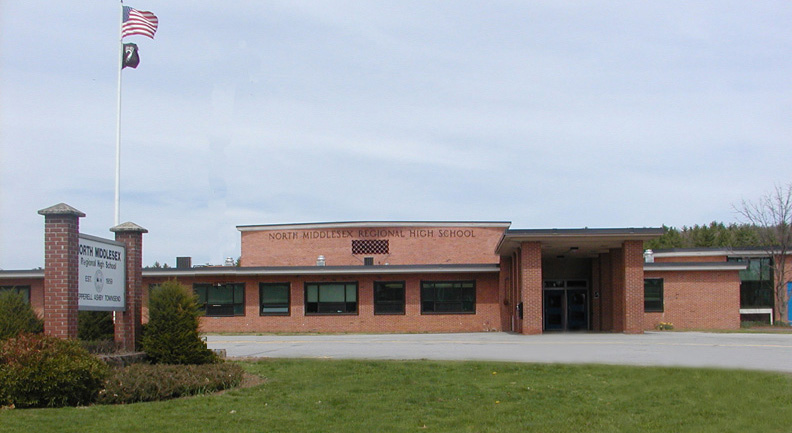

Location
- 19 Main Street, Townsend, Massachusetts; 01469; United States; 42.6515°N 71.6610°W

Information
- Type: Public Secondary; Open enrollment
- Motto: We Are NM
- Established: 1959
- School district: North Middlesex Regional School District
- Superintendent: Brad Morgan
- Principal: Laurie Smith
- Teaching staff: 564.10 (on an FTE basis)
- Grades: 9–12
- Enrollment: 711 (2024–2025)
- Student to teacher ratio: 13.14
- Colors: Blue, red, and white
- Athletics conference: Midland Wachusett League
- Mascot: Pat the Patriot
- Team name: Patriots
- Newspaper: The NM Journal
- Communities served: Townsend, Pepperell, Ashby
- Website: nmrhs.nmrsd.org

North Middlesex Regional High School is a public high school located in Townsend, Massachusetts, United States, in Middlesex County. It serves grades 9–12 primarily from Townsend, Pepperell, and Ashby. North Middlesex Regional High School has approximately 800 students.

According to the official North Middlesex Regional School District website, North Middlesex is a comprehensive school accredited by the New England Association of Schools and Colleges. The professional staff includes approximately seventy-five full-time teachers, a library/media coordinator, an academic support center coordinator, four guidance counselors, three school nurses, a school psychologist, approximately fifteen teaching assistants, two assistant principals, one principal, and a resource officer.

== History ==
The school was built in 1957–1959 and an addition was added in 1972. The citizens of the neighboring town of Mason, New Hampshire expressed an interest in possibly joining the North Middlesex District in 2006. However, the choice was voted down by New Ipswich and other members of Mason's current school district.

In 2014, the towns of Pepperell, Ashby, and Townsend voted for the construction of a new building, which opened for the 2017-2018 school year. Prior to its first day in use, a bomb threat was received, necessitating the presence of the Townsend, MA police department with metal detectors. The adjacent older school's demolition was started in the fall of 2017. The older school was completely demolished in the summer of 2018. The school has also received a new track and turf field, which was completed in June 2019.

== Extracurricular activities ==
There are three vocal performing ensembles at North Middlesex. There are five instrumental performing ensembles, including the wind symphony, concert band, jazz band, marching band, and winter percussion ensemble. The North Middlesex Tri-M Music Honor Society students also run Stars@Symphony, a two-day event that takes place at Mechanics Hall (Worcester, MA) and Symphony Hall (Boston, MA) which showcases bands that receive gold medal ratings from the Massachusetts Instrumental and Choral Conductors Association.

North Middlesex offers several service opportunities including New Orleans Service Learning and New York Service Learning. Both groups doing service in their respective cities. New Orleans Service Learning is often regarded as the most prestigious of the two with limited space and a competitive applications process.

North Middlesex also offers Relay For Life, Model UN and Giving Tree.

== Athletics ==
North Middlesex Regional High School hosts many athletic teams which compete in the Midland Wachusett league(Mid-Wach).

- Fall
  - Football
  - Boys Soccer
  - Girls Soccer
  - Boys and Girls Cross Country
  - Unified Cross Country
  - Field Hockey
  - Golf
  - Volleyball
  - Cheerleading
  - Unified Basketball
- Winter
  - Boys Basketball
  - Girls Basketball
  - Boys Ice Hockey
  - Indoor Track and Field
  - Girls Ice Hockey (Co-op with Leominster )
  - Swimming (Co-op with Leominster High School)
  - Wrestling
  - Gymnastics (Co-op with Groton-Dunstable)
  - Alpine Ski (Co-op with Bromfield)
- Spring
  - Baseball
  - Softball
  - Track and Field
  - Unified Track
  - Boys Lacrosse
  - Girls Lacrosse
  - Girls Tennis
  - Boys Tennis
