= Antonello Paparella =

Italian microbiologist

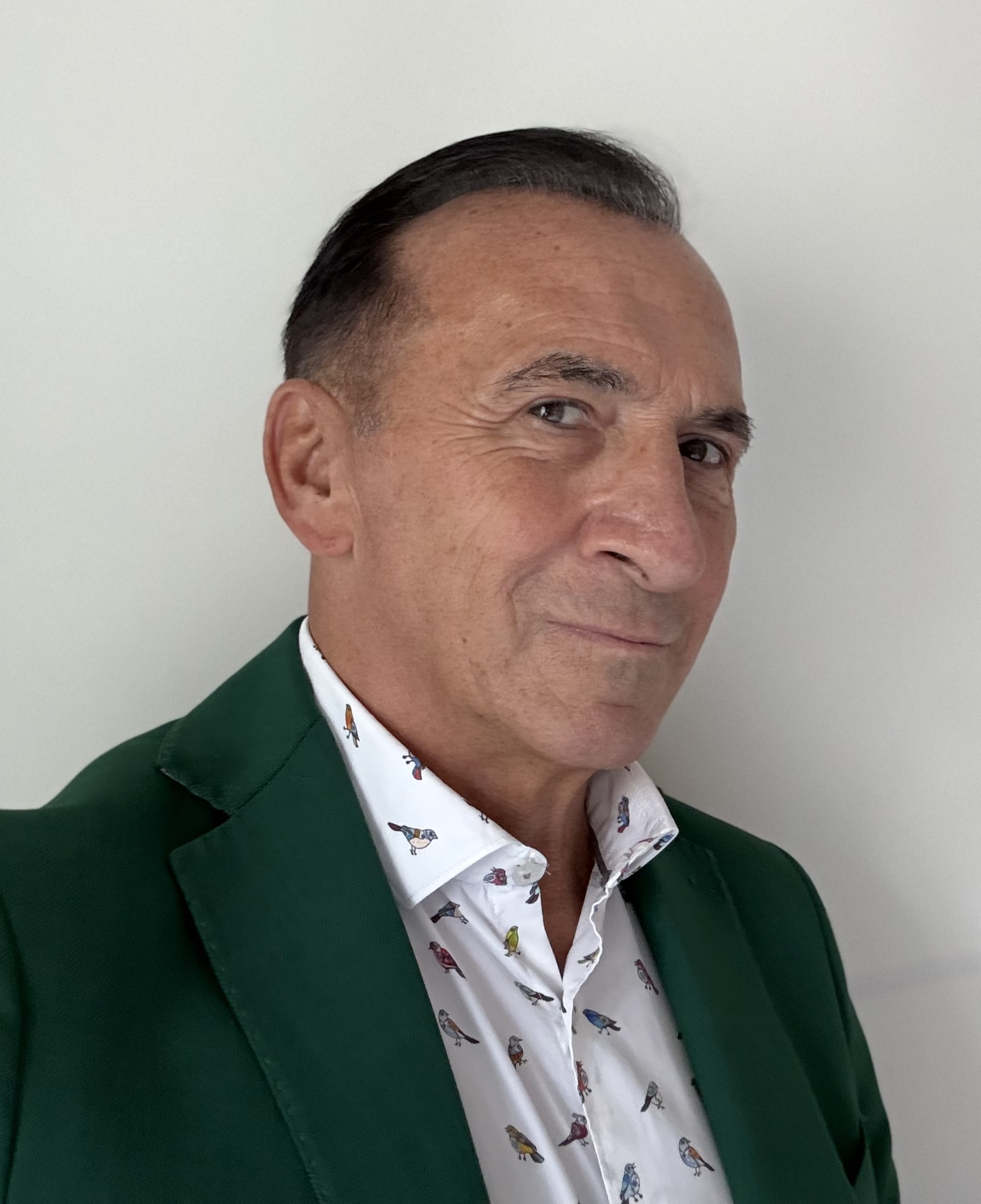
- Occupations: Food microbiologist and academic

Academic background
- Education: Graduation in Veterinary Medicine; Diploma in Veterinary Pathological Anatomy and Food Safety
- Alma mater: University of Bari, Italy; University of Bologna, Italy

Antonello Paparella is a food microbiologist and academic. He is a professor of Food Microbiology in the Department of Bioscience and Technology for Food, Agriculture, and Environment at the University of Teramo, Italy. His research work has focused on different aspects of food microbiology, including microbial ecology of foods, pathogens, food preservation, antimicrobial resistance, and biofilm formation, with an emphasis on the application of essential oils and hydrolates in food preservation and in food environments.

== Education ==
In 1985, Paparella completed his graduation in Veterinary Medicine at the University of Bari, Italy. In 1987, he earned his Diploma of Veterinary Pathological Anatomy and Food Safety from the University of Bologna, Italy.

== Career ==
From 1987 to 1994, Paparella worked as a research director at the BeCa SpA, Bologna. Subsequently, he assumed the position of R&D manager at Fiorucci SpA, Rome, which he maintained till 1996. At the Food Assistance and ITA (ITA Life Analytics), he was employed as a scientific director in 1996. Additionally, he held the role in the Italian group of experts at the Italian Standardisation Body (UNI), as well as in the group of experts "Bilan des viands" at the European Union.

From 1991, Paparella held the appointment of adjunct professor of Food Safety at academic institutions. In 2000, he worked as an associate professor of Food Microbiology at the University of Teramo, where he was also designated as a professor of Food Microbiology at the Faculty of Bioscience and Technology for Food, Agriculture and Environment in 2006. He was on the board of directors of the National Council for Agricultural Research (CREA), held the position of special commissioner at the National Institute of Dairy Science (CREA), and was also a member of the Commission on Environmental Impact.

== Research ==
One of the research topics in Paparella's publications is Listeria monocytogenes and other pathogens in ready-to-eat foods. In this respect, his team has investigated the antimicrobial mechanisms of essential oils using flow cytometry, and highlighted different mechanisms of action for thyme, cinnamon, and oregano essential oils. In a collaborative study using electron paramagnetic resonance, he demonstrated that oregano essential oil targets the cell membrane of Listeria monocytogenes. Moreover, his team has assessed the ability of Listeria monocytogenes to contaminate food-processing surfaces. He has also emphasized strategies for preventing or eliminating biofilms using natural antimicrobials, highlighting that hydrolates (Citrus aurantium) and essential oils (Corydothymus capitatus and Origanum hirtum) may regulate Listeria biofilms on specific food-contact surfaces, particularly avoiding biofilm growth on polystyrene or stainless steel surfaces.

Paparella's research has also explored the microbial ecology of traditional Italian fermented meats, exemplified by studies identifying dominant bacterial species such as Lactobacillus curvatus in Italian sausage. Later in 2020, Lactobacillus curvatus was reclassified as Latilactobacillus curvatus. He has investigated the role of biogenic amines (BAs) as quality and stability indicators in meat and has highlighted that excess BAs in seafood can cause life-threatening health issues. His team carried out research aimed at understanding spoilage organisms, specifically investigating the occurrence and role of organisms such as Shewanella spp. in muscle foods.

Paparella has also addressed antimicrobial resistance by investigating how integrating essential oils with antibiotics can increase bacterial sensitivity to antimicrobials. His team identified that these combinations against resistant Salmonella strains significantly decreased the antibiotic's minimum inhibitory concentration (MIC), thus restoring microbial sensitivity in antibiotic-resistant strains. Moreover, he also demonstrated that antimicrobial efficacy can be significantly increased by combining essential oils with antibiotics in a synergistic manner.

== Selected articles ==
- Grande-Tovar, Carlos David; Chaves-Lopez, Clemencia; Serio, Annalisa; Rossi, Chiara; Paparella, Antonello (2018). "Chitosan coatings enriched with essential oils: Effects on fungi involved in fruit decay and mechanisms of action". Trends in Food Science & Technology. 78: 61–71. doi:10.1016/j.tifs.2018.05.019.
- Rossi, Chiara; Serio, Annalisa; Chaves-López, Clemencia; Anniballi, Fabrizio; Auricchio, Bruna; Goffredo, Elisa; Cenci-Goga, Beniamino Terzo; Lista, Florigio; Fillo, Silvia; Paparella, Antonello (2018). "Biofilm formation, pigment production and motility in Pseudomonas spp. isolated from the dairy industry". Food Control. 86: 241–248. doi:10.1016/j.foodcont.2017.11.018.
- Rossi, Chiara; Chaves-López, Clemencia; Možina, Sonja Smole; Di Mattia, Carla; Scuota, Stefania; Luzzi, Ida; Jenič, Teja; Paparella, Antonello; Serio, Annalisa (2019). "Salmonella enterica adhesion: Effect of Cinnamomum zeylanicum essential oil on lettuce". LWT. 111: 16–22. doi:10.1016/j.lwt.2019.05.026.
- Schirone, Maria; Esposito, Luigi; D’Onofrio, Federica; Visciano, Pierina; Martuscelli, Maria; Mastrocola, Dino; Paparella, Antonello (2022). "Biogenic amines in meat and meat products: A review of the science and future perspectives". Foods. 11 (6): 788. doi:10.3390/foods11060788. PMC 8947279. PMID 35327210.
- Maggio, Francesca; Lauteri, Carlotta; Rossi, Chiara; Ferri, Gianluigi; Serio, Annalisa; Vergara, Alberto; Paparella, Antonello (2024). "Combined effect of Tetracycline compounds and essential oils on antimicrobial resistant Salmonella enterica isolated from the swine food chain". Frontiers in Microbiology. 15 1439286. doi:10.3389/fmicb.2024.1439286. PMC 11687403. PMID 39741589.
- Anniballi, Fabrizio; Purgatorio, Chiara; Serio, Annalisa; Scalfaro, Concetta; Taglieri, Silvia; Paparella, Antonello (2025). "Gene expression dynamics in Bacillus cereus and Bacillus subtilis treated with Thymus vulgaris and Origanum vulgare subsp. hirtum essential oils". Frontiers in Microbiology. 16 1643608. doi:10.3389/fmicb.2025.1643608. PMC 12411504. PMID 40919200.
