= East Pepperell, Massachusetts =

- Census-designated place
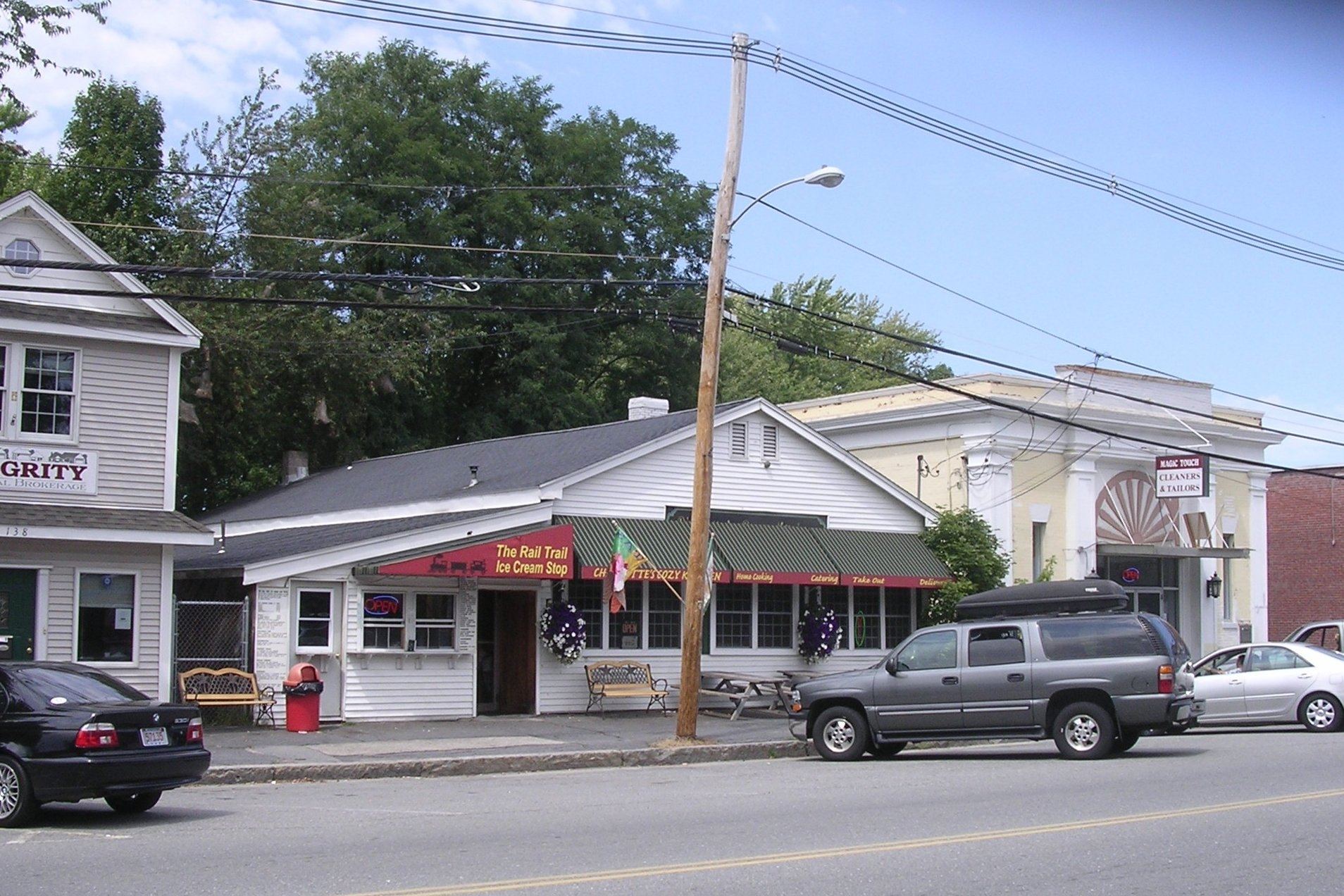
- Ice cream shop in Railroad Square

- Location in Middlesex County in Massachusetts
- Coordinates: 42°40′1″N 71°33′51″W
- Country: United States
- State: Massachusetts
- County: Middlesex
- Town: Pepperell

Area
  - Total: 1.45 sq mi (3.76 km^{2})
  - Land: 1.42 sq mi (3.67 km^{2})
  - Water: 0.039 sq mi (0.10 km^{2})
- Elevation: 226 ft (69 m)

Population (2020)
  - Total: 2,120
  - Density: 1,497.2/sq mi (578.09/km^{2})
- Time zone: UTC-5 (Eastern (EST))
  - Summer (DST): UTC-4 (EDT)
- ZIP code: 01463 (Pepperell)
- Area code: 978
- FIPS code: 25-20310
- GNIS feature ID: 0611110

East Pepperell is a village and census-designated place (CDP) in the town of Pepperell in Middlesex County, Massachusetts, United States. The population was 2,120 at the 2020 census.

== History ==
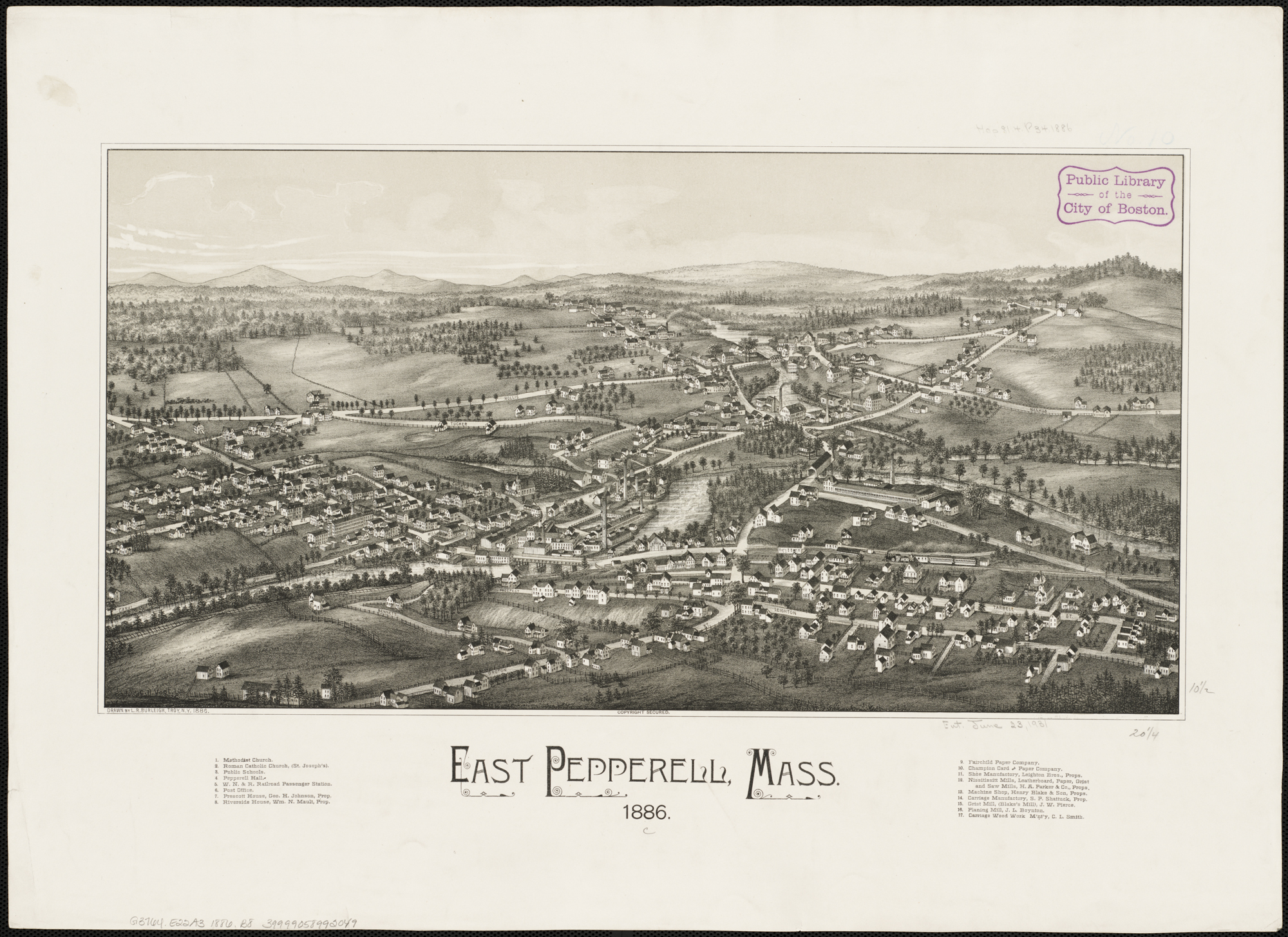
Lithograph of East Pepperell from 1886 by L.R. Burleigh with list of landmarks

Like the town of Pepperell, East Pepperell is named for Sir William Pepperrell, a Massachusetts colonial soldier who led the Siege of Louisbourg during King George's War.

On the night of Monday, July 4, 1921, a chauffeur by the name of Percy England was returning to his boarding place in East Pepperell, Massachusetts accompanied by the daughter of his landlady, Mrs. Loretta Lavender. Suddenly, he was grabbed by two masked men and forced him into an automobile as the men shot a from a revolver and threatened to kill England if he escaped. They took him to a pasture on the property of Meredith where a third man appeared with a whip, a pail of hot tar (most likely pine tar) and feathers. The men stripped England to the waist, whipped, and tarred and feathered him. He was ordered to leave town and warned that if he did not, his treatment would be repeated. England suffered from welts, sears, and burns on his back and head, showing his wounds while in court to support his case.

Brothers Grover C. Robbins, a Pennsylvania preparatory school principal, his brother, Roger S. Robbins, and Robert R. Meredith of Pepperell were sentenced to serve three months in the house of correction and fined $100 each. Although the exact cause of Percy England's attack was unknown, it was known that the men disapproved of his attention to a young female relative while he was preparing to divorce his wife, who was living in New Zealand. }}

Percy England was one of a number of people tarred and feathered for either having an affair or falling for a much younger woman. Other victims included Joseph Smith in 1832, Charles G. Kelsey in 1872, Dr. S. L. Newsome in 1930, and Alice Knowles in 1939.

== Geography ==
East Pepperell is located in northern Middlesex County at 42°40′1″N 71°33′51″W (42.666956, -71.564063), in the eastern section of the town of Pepperell. It is separated from the main village of Pepperell to the west by the Nashua River. East Pepperell is bordered to the northeast by the town of Dunstable and to the south by the town of Groton.

Massachusetts Route 113 passes through the village, leading west into Pepperell village and east 15 miles (24 km) to Lowell.

According to the United States Census Bureau, the East Pepperell CDP has a total area of 1.45 square miles (3.8 km^{2}), of which 0.04 square miles (0.10 km^{2}), or 2.55%, are water.

== Demographics ==
Historical population
Census	Pop.	Note	%±
1990	2,296		—
2000	2,034		−11.4%
2010	2,059		1.2%
2020	2,120		3.0%
U.S. Decennial Census

=== 2020 census ===
As of the 2020 census, East Pepperell had a population of 2,120. The median age was 41.8 years. 21.3% of residents were under the age of 18 and 17.5% of residents were 65 years of age or older. For every 100 females, there were 90.6 males, and for every 100 females age 18 and over, there were 87.0 males age 18 and over.

100.0% of residents lived in urban areas, while 0.0% lived in rural areas.

There were 869 households in East Pepperell, of which 27.8% had children under the age of 18 living in them. Of all households, 47.2% were married-couple households, 19.3% were households with a male householder and no spouse or partner present, and 27.3% were households with a female householder and no spouse or partner present. About 27.5% of all households were made up of individuals, and 10.3% had someone living alone who was 65 years of age or older.

There were 904 housing units, of which 3.9% were vacant. The homeowner vacancy rate was 1.9% and the rental vacancy rate was 5.2%.

Racial composition as of the 2020 census
Race	Number	Percent
White	1,886	89.0%
Black or African American	15	0.7%
American Indian and Alaska Native	3	0.1%
Asian	56	2.6%
Native Hawaiian and Other Pacific Islander	0	0.0%
Some other race	21	1.0%
Two or more races	139	6.6%
Hispanic or Latino (of any race)	65	3.1%

=== 2000 census ===
As of the census of 2000, there were 2,034 people, 714 households, and 566 families residing in the CDP. The population density was 557.0/km^{2} (1,437.7/mi^{2}). There were 722 housing units at an average density of 197.7/km^{2} (510.3/mi^{2}). The racial makeup of the CDP was 96.21% White, 0.84% African American, 0.20% Native American, 0.39% Asian, 0.69% from other races, and 1.67% from two or more races. Hispanic or Latino of any race were 1.18% of the population.

There were 714 households, out of which 43.4% had children under the age of 18 living with them, 58.5% were married couples living together, 17.4% had a female householder with no husband present, and 20.6% were non-families. 16.1% of all households were made up of individuals, and 4.1% had someone living alone who was 65 years of age or older. The average household size was 2.85 and the average family size was 3.18.

In the CDP, the age distribution of the population shows 29.7% under the age of 18, 8.6% from 18 to 24, 31.1% from 25 to 44, 23.4% from 45 to 64, and 7.2% who were 65 years of age or older. The median age was 34 years. For every 100 females, there were 95.8 males. For every 100 females age 18 and over, there were 90.0 males.

The median income for a household in the CDP was $55,272, and the median income for a family was $57,391. Males had a median income of $38,897 versus $31,129 for females. The per capita income for the CDP was $20,759. None of the families and 1.8% of the population were living below the poverty line, including no under eighteens and 25.6% of those over 64.
