= Pepperell (CDP), Massachusetts =

Pepperell, Massachusetts
- Census-designated place
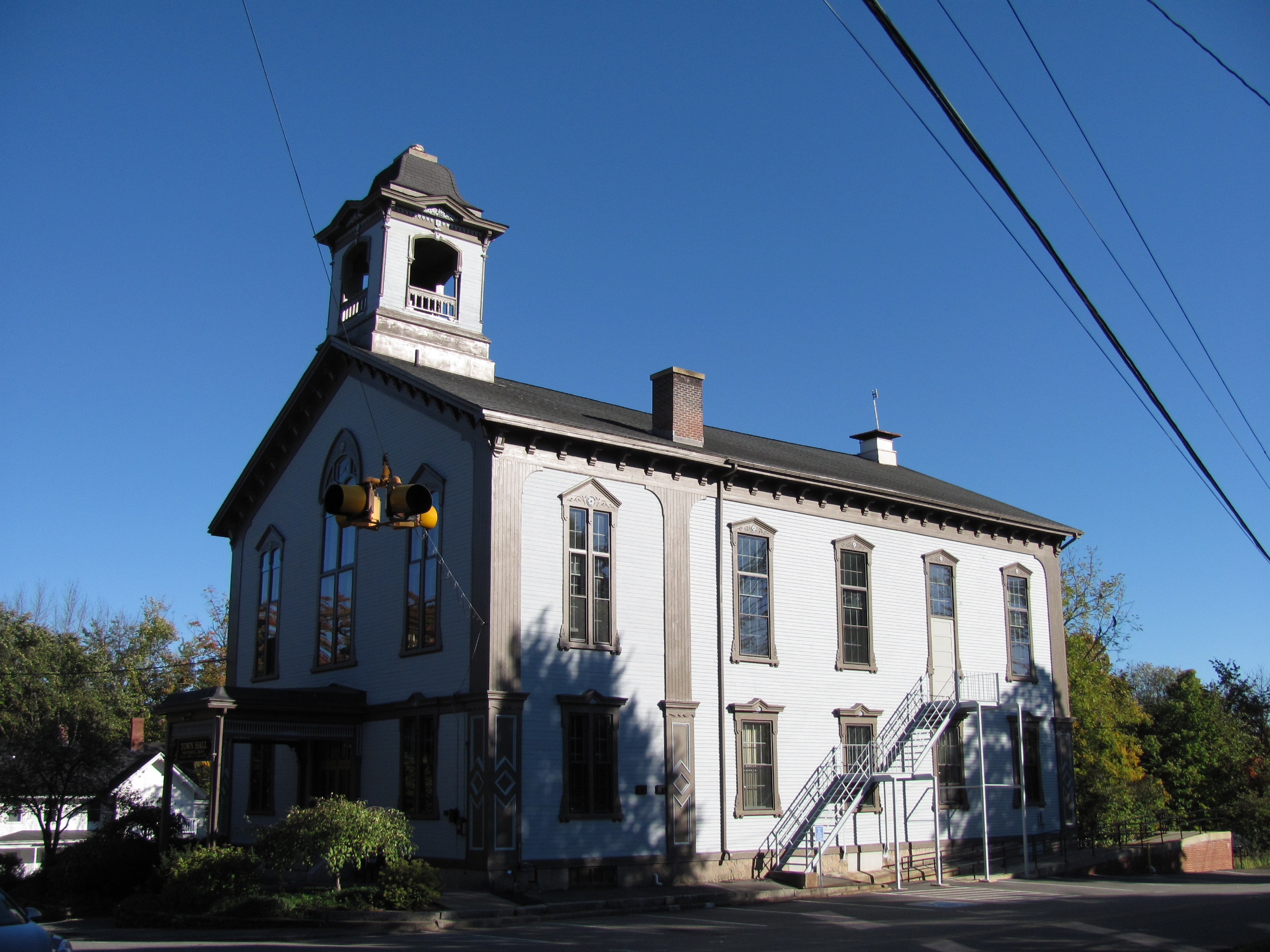
- Pepperell Town Hall

- Location in Middlesex County in Massachusetts
- Coordinates: 42°40′4″N 71°35′16″W
- Country: United States
- State: Massachusetts
- County: Middlesex
- Town: Pepperell

Area
  - Total: 2.14 sq mi (5.55 km^{2})
  - Land: 2.07 sq mi (5.36 km^{2})
  - Water: 0.069 sq mi (0.18 km^{2})
- Elevation: 240 ft (73 m)

Population (2020)
  - Total: 2,390
  - Density: 1,154.0/sq mi (445.57/km^{2})
- Time zone: UTC-5 (Eastern (EST))
  - Summer (DST): UTC-4 (EDT)
- ZIP code: 01463
- Area code: 978
- FIPS code: 25-52770
- GNIS feature ID: 0611153

Pepperell is a census-designated place (CDP) comprising the main village in the town of Pepperell in Middlesex County, Massachusetts, United States. The population was 2,390 at the 2020 census, out of 11,604 in the entire town of Pepperell.

== Geography ==
Pepperell village is located in northwestern Middlesex County at 42°40′4″N 71°35′15″W (42.667886, -71.587701), slightly east of the center of the town of Pepperell. It is bordered to the east, across the Nashua River, by the village of East Pepperell.

Massachusetts Route 111 passes through the village center, leading south 4 miles (6 km) to Groton and northeast 10 miles (16 km) to Nashua, New Hampshire. Massachusetts Route 113 crosses MA 111 in the center of the village, leading east 9 miles (14 km) to Tyngsborough and southwest 3 miles (5 km) to Massachusetts Route 119. Townsend is 7 miles (11 km) west of Pepperell via Routes 113 and 119.

According to the United States Census Bureau, the Pepperell CDP has a total area of 2.14 square miles (5.54 km^{2}), of which 2.07 square miles (5.36 km^{2}) are land, and 0.07 square miles (0.18 km^{2}) (3.31%) are water. Via the Nashua River, the village is part of the Merrimack River watershed.

== Demographics ==
Historical population
Census	Pop.	Note	%±
1970	1,076		—
1980	2,076		92.9%
1990	2,350		13.2%
2000	2,517		7.1%
2010	2,504		−0.5%
2020	2,390		−4.6%
U.S. Decennial Census

As of the census of 2000, there were 2,517 people, 931 households, and 629 families residing in the CDP. The population density was 481.1/km^{2} (1,246.7/mi^{2}). There were 953 housing units at an average density of 182.2/km^{2} (472.0/mi^{2}). The racial makeup of the CDP was 96.31% White, 0.68% Black or African American, 0.20% Native American, 1.23% Asian, 0.28% from other races, and 1.31% from two or more races. Hispanic or Latino of any race were 0.72% of the population.

There were 931 households, out of which 40.7% had children under the age of 18 living with them, 53.0% were married couples living together, 10.6% had a female householder with no husband present, and 32.4% were non-families. 27.5% of all households were made up of individuals, and 10.6% had someone living alone who was 65 years of age or older. The average household size was 2.70 and the average family size was 3.35.

In the CDP, the population was spread out, with 30.4% under the age of 18, 6.3% from 18 to 24, 34.4% from 25 to 44, 19.0% from 45 to 64, and 9.8% who were 65 years of age or older. The median age was 34 years. For every 100 females, there were 93.6 males. For every 100 females age 18 and over, there were 93.1 males.

The median income for a household in the CDP was $45,984, and the median income for a family was $52,165. Males had a median income of $39,375 versus $32,634 for females. The per capita income for the CDP was $21,069. About 5.1% of families and 8.6% of the population were below the poverty line, including 6.7% of those under age 18 and 9.6% of those age 65 or over.
