= Townsend, Massachusetts =

- Town
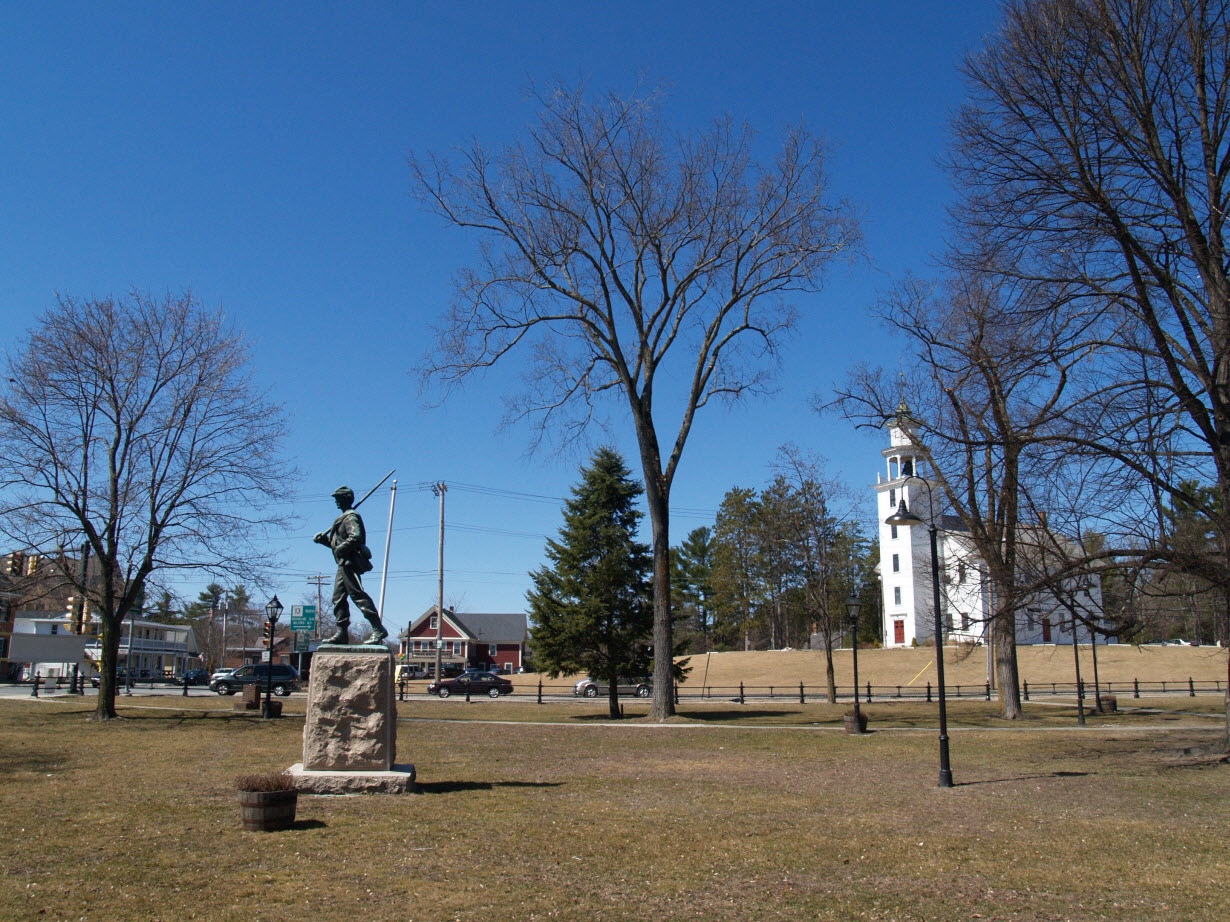
- Townsend Common

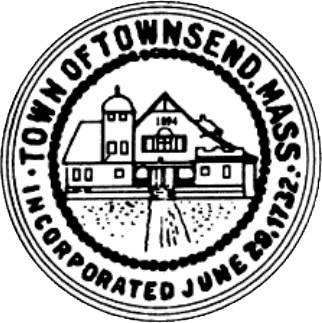
- Seal

- Location in Middlesex County in Massachusetts
- Coordinates: 42°40′00″N 71°42′20″W
- Country: United States
- State: Massachusetts
- County: Middlesex
- Settled: 1676
- Incorporated: 1732

Government
  - Type: Open town meeting

Area
  - Total: 33.1 sq mi (85.8 km^{2})
  - Land: 32.9 sq mi (85.1 km^{2})
  - Water: 0.23 sq mi (0.6 km^{2})
- Elevation: 315 ft (96 m)

Population (2020)
  - Total: 9,127
  - Density: 278/sq mi (107/km^{2})
- Time zone: UTC−5 (Eastern)
  - Summer (DST): UTC−4 (Eastern)
- ZIP Codes: 01469 (Townsend); 01474 (West Townsend)
- Area codes: 978, 480, 617
- FIPS code: 24-70360
- GNIS feature ID: 0618238
- Website: www.townsendma.gov

Townsend is a town in Middlesex County, Massachusetts, United States. The population was 9,127 at the 2020 census. It contains the census-designated place of the same name.

== History ==
Townsend was first settled by Europeans in 1676 in an area known by indigenous people of the area as Wistequassuck, and was officially incorporated in 1732. The town was named after Charles Townshend, English secretary of state and an opponent of the Tories. The town initially used the same spelling as its namesake, but the "h" was dropped in patriotic fervor in response to the Townshend Acts of 1767. The current spelling of Townsend became official by 1780.

== Geography ==
According to the United States Census Bureau, the town has a total area of 33.1 square miles (85.8 km^{2}), of which 32.9 square miles (85.1 km^{2}) is land and 0.2 square mile (0.6 km^{2}) (0.72%) is water. The headwaters of the Squannacook River rise in the town's western hills. Townsend has the largest land area of any town in Middlesex County.

Townsend is bordered by Mason, New Hampshire, and Brookline, New Hampshire to the north, Pepperell to the east, Groton and Shirley to the southeast, Lunenburg to the south, and Ashby to the west.

Route 119 runs east-west through Townsend, and Route 13 runs north-south.

== Demographics ==
Historical population
| Year | Pop. | ±% |
|---|---|---|
| 1790 | 993 | — |
| 1850 | 1,947 | +96.1% |
| 1860 | 2,005 | +3.0% |
| 1870 | 1,962 | −2.1% |
| 1880 | 1,967 | +0.3% |
| 1890 | 1,750 | −11.0% |
| 1900 | 1,804 | +3.1% |
| 1910 | 1,761 | −2.4% |
| 1920 | 1,575 | −10.6% |
| 1930 | 1,752 | +11.2% |
| 1940 | 2,065 | +17.9% |
| 1950 | 2,817 | +36.4% |
| 1960 | 3,650 | +29.6% |
| 1970 | 4,281 | +17.3% |
| 1980 | 7,201 | +68.2% |
| 1990 | 8,496 | +18.0% |
| 2000 | 9,198 | +8.3% |
| 2010 | 8,926 | −3.0% |
| 2020 | 9,127 | +2.3% |
| 2022* | 8,948 | −2.0% |
* = population estimate. Source: United States census records and Population Estimates Program data.

As of the census of 2010, there were 8,926 people, 3,240 households, and 2,483 families residing in the town. The population density was 279.8 inhabitants per square mile (108.0/km^{2}). There were 3,516 housing units at an average density of 96.9 per square mile (37.4/km^{2}). The racial makeup of the town was 96.7% White, 0.6% Black or African American, 0.2% Native American, 0.8% Asian, 0.0% Pacific Islander, 0.4% from other races, and 1.3% from two or more races. Hispanic or Latino of any race were 1.8% of the population.

There were 3,240 households, out of which 34% had children under the age of 18 living with them, 62.7% were married couples living together, 9.9% had a female householder with no husband present, and 23.4% were non-families. 18.4% of all households were made up of individuals, and 6% had someone living alone who was 65 years of age or older. The average household size was 2.75 and the average family size was 3.14.

In the town, the population was spread out, with 24.9% under the age of 18, 5.4% from 18 to 24, 22.8% from 25 to 44, 34.8% from 45 to 64, and 9.6% who were 65 years of age or older. The median age was 41.7 years. For every 100 females, there were 97.7 males. For every 100 females age 18 and over, there were 95.8 males.

The median income for a household in the town was $76,533, and the median income for a family was $87,227. Males had a median income of $52,714 versus $35,843 for females. The per capita income for the town was $29,862. About 3.3% of families and 5.2% of the population were below the poverty line, including 3.4% of those under age 18 and 3.1% of those age 65

== Education ==
Townsend is part of the North Middlesex Regional School District, along with Ashby, and Pepperell. The town has one elementary school, the Spaulding Memorial Elementary School. The town has one middle school, Hawthorne Brook Middle School, which also serves as the middle school for neighboring Ashby. High School students then attend North Middlesex Regional High School. Students are also allowed to choose to attend Nashoba Valley Technical High School, located in Westford.

== Gallery ==
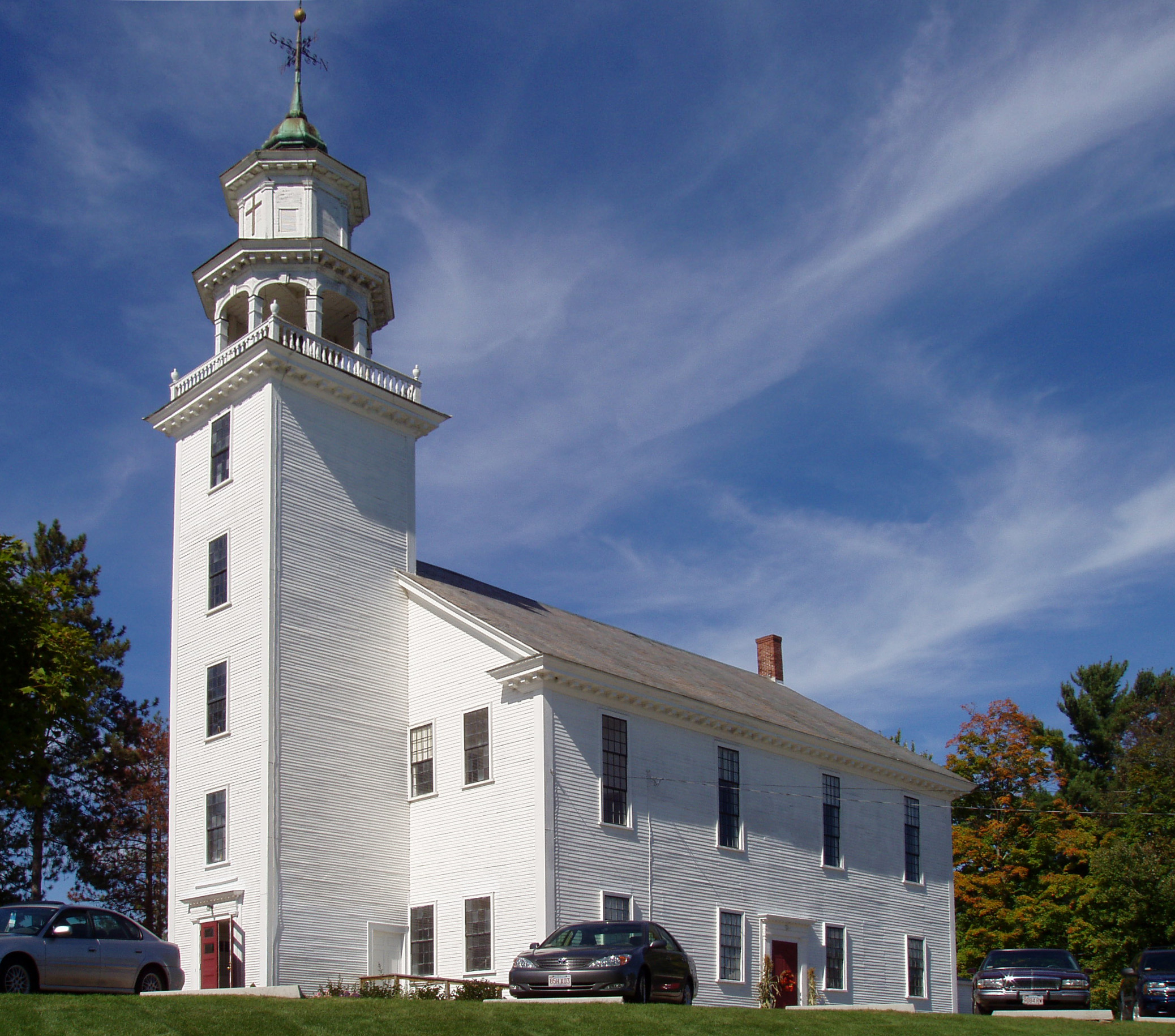
United Methodist Church (1770)

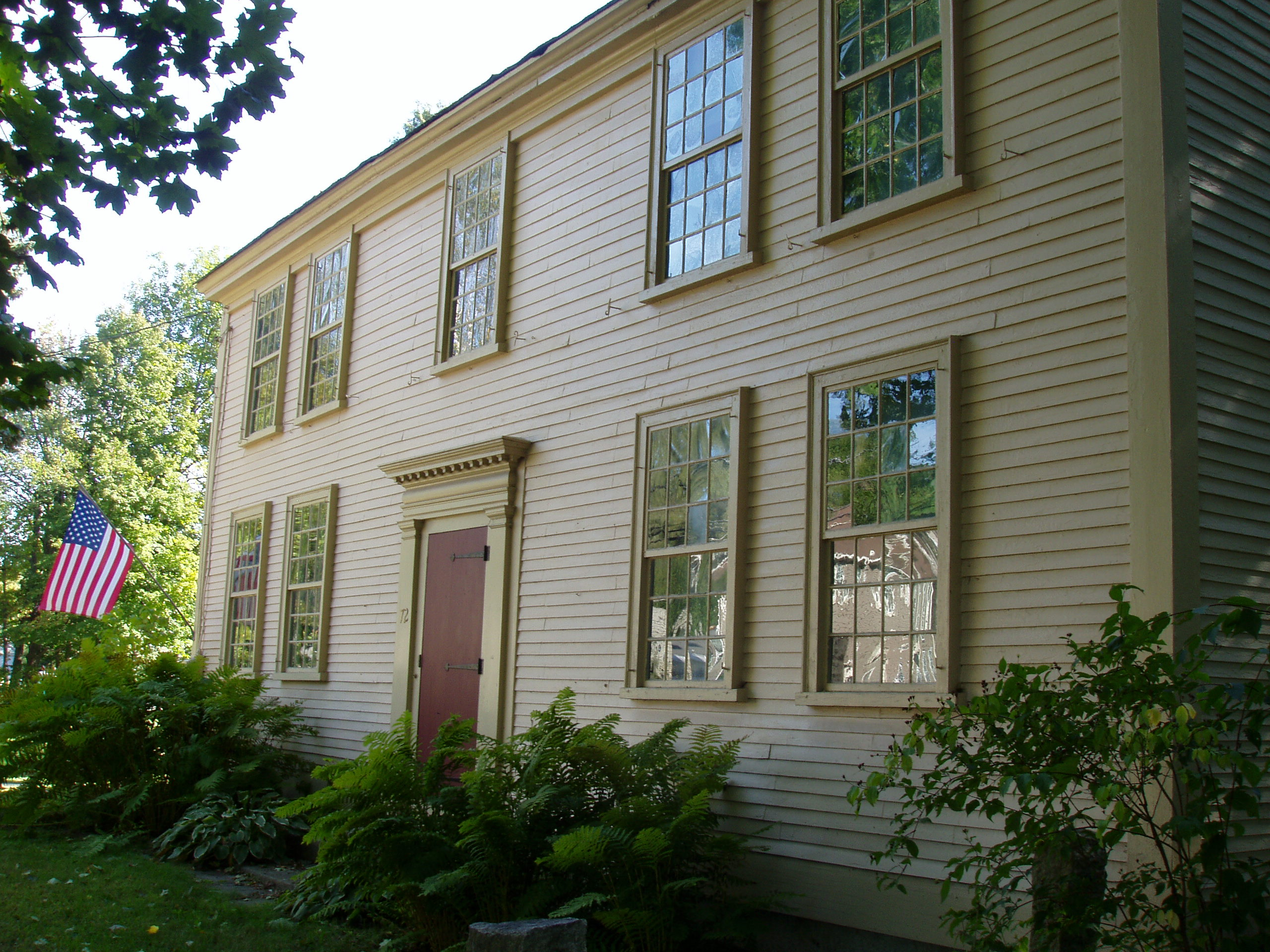
Reed Homestead, with murals attributed to Rufus Porter, founder of Scientific American

== Notable people ==
- Daniel Adams, physician, textbook author, and state legislator
- Christiana Bennett, former Ballet West principal ballerina
- John Kerin, professional baseball umpire
- Daniel LaPlante, Murderer
- Dave Miller, Professional darts player
- Huntley N. Spaulding, Governor of New Hampshire
- Rolland H. Spaulding, Governor of New Hampshire
- Mary Walcott, witness at the Salem witch trials
