= WHAB =

- Acton, Massachusetts; United States
- Frequency: 89.1 MHz

Programming
- Format: High school radio

Ownership
- Owner: Acton-Boxborough Regional High School; (Acton-Boxborough Regional School District)

History
- First air date: August 1, 1979
- Call sign meaning: High school, Acton-Boxborough

Technical information
- Licensing authority: FCC
- Facility ID: 426
- Class: D
- ERP: 8 watts
- HAAT: 8 meters (26 ft)
- Transmitter coordinates: 42°28′48.3″N 71°27′26.2″W

Links
- Public license information: Public file; LMS
- Website: sites.google.com/abschools.org/whab-ab-radio/home

WHAB (89.1 FM) is a high school radio station licensed to serve Acton, Massachusetts. The station is owned by Acton-Boxborough Regional High School and licensed to the Acton-Boxborough Regional School District. It airs a high school radio format. WHAB is one of more than a dozen FCC-licensed high school radio stations in the state of Massachusetts.

The station was assigned the WHAB call letters by the Federal Communications Commission.

After technical issues that left the station silent for a time in the early 1990s, WHAB returned to full-time broadcasting in 1995. In addition to its FM signal, WHAB's programming is carried on Acton Community Television and in a studio room near the high school's cafeteria.
