= Littleton, Massachusetts =

- Town
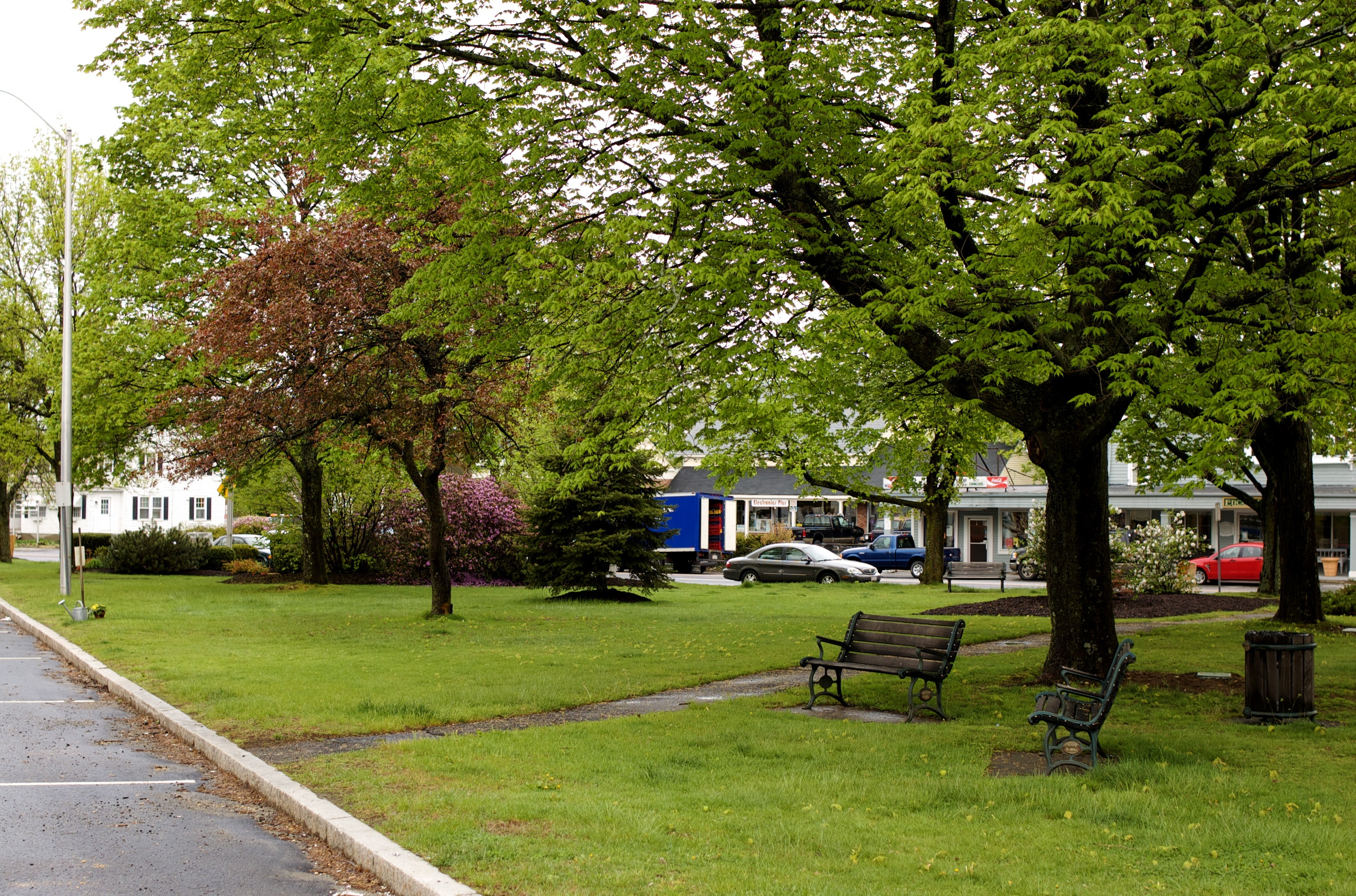

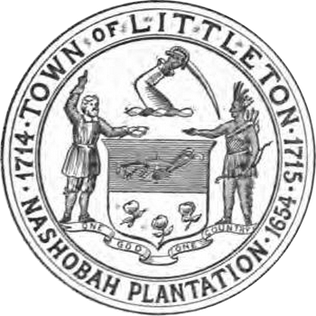
- Seal

- Location in Middlesex County in Massachusetts
- Coordinates: 42°32′15″N 71°30′45″W
- Country: United States
- State: Massachusetts
- County: Middlesex
- Settled: 1686
- Incorporated: 1715

Government
  - Type: Open town meeting
  - Town Administrator: James Duggan
  - Select Board: Gary Wilson, Charles DeCoste, Mark Rambacher, Matthew Nordhaus, Karen Lee Morrison
  - Police Chief: Mathew Pinard
  - Fire Chief: Steele McCurdy

Area
  - Total: 17.6 sq mi (45.5 km^{2})
  - Land: 16.6 sq mi (43.0 km^{2})
  - Water: 0.93 sq mi (2.4 km^{2})
- Elevation: 230 ft (70 m)

Population (2020)
  - Total: 10,141
  - Density: 611/sq mi (235.8/km^{2})
- Time zone: UTC−5 (Eastern)
  - Summer (DST): UTC−4 (Eastern)
- ZIP Code: 01460
- Area code: 351/978
- FIPS code: 25-35950
- GNIS feature ID: 0619403
- Website: www.littletonma.org

Littleton (historically Nashoba) is a town in Middlesex County, Massachusetts, United States. The population was 10,141 at the 2020 census. It contains the census-designated place of Littleton Common.

== History ==
=== 17th century ===
Littleton was the site of the sixth Praying Indian village established by John Eliot in 1645 consisting of mainly Native Americans of the Massachusett tribes. It was called Nashoba Plantation, on the land between Lake Nagog and Fort Pond. The term "Praying Indian" referred to Native Americans who had been converted to Christianity. Daniel Gookin, in his Historical Collections of the Indians in New England, (1674) chapter vii. says:

Nashobah is the sixth praying Indian town. This village is situated, in a manner, in the centre, between Chelmsford, Lancaster, Groton and Concord. It lieth from Boston about twenty-five miles west north west. The inhabitants are about ten families, and consequently about fifty souls.

At the time of King Philip's War between the English and Native Americans, the General Court ordered the Indians at Nashoba to be interned in Concord. A short while later, some Concord residents who were hostile to the Nashoba solicited some militia to remove them to Deer Island. Around this time, fourteen armed men of Chelmsford went to the outlying camp at Wameset (near Forge Pond) and opened fire on the unsuspecting Nashoba, wounding five women and children, and killing outright a boy twelve years old, the only son of John Tahattawan. For much of the war, the English colonists rounded up the Praying Indians and sent them to Deer Island. When increasing numbers of Massachusetts Bay officers began successfully using Praying Indians as scouts in the war, the sentiment of the white settlers turned. In May 1676, the Massachusetts General Court ordered that Praying Indians be removed from Deer Island. Still, many died of starvation and disease. Upon their release, most survivors moved to Natick and sold their land to white settlers.

The town was settled by Anglo-European settlers in 1686 and was officially incorporated by act of the Massachusetts General Court on November 2, 1715. It was part of the Puritan and later Congregational culture and religion of New England.

In his book An Historical Sketch Town of Littleton (1890), Herbert Joseph Harwood wrote:

It is said that the name Littleton was given as a compliment to Hon. George Lyttleton, M.P., one of the commissioners of the treasury [one time Chancellor of the Exchequer], and that in acknowledgment he sent from England a church-bell as a present to the town but on account of the error in spelling by substituting "i " for "y," the present was withheld by the person having it in charge, who gave the excuse that no such town as Lyttleton could be found, and sold the bell."

=== 18th century ===
The few survivors of Nashobah Plantation had extreme difficulty in reviving the village. The few that returned intermarried with some of the English settlers who had bought land from them and quickly outnumbered the natives. The new community petitioned the legislature and incorporated as a town in 1714 with its limits (including modern Boxborough) bounded by the existing towns of The Plantation of Groton to the west, Chelmsford to the north, Stow to the south and west, and Concord to the south and east. The meetinghouse of the town moved from the area of Newtown to eastern triangle of the Town Common in 1717. Sarah Doublet, the last Praying Indian, passed on in 1736.

New neighboring towns formed from larger towns abutting Littleton. West Chelmsford soon grew large enough to sustain its own governance, and was officially incorporated as Westford on September 23, 1729, A new town including parts of Lancaster, Groton, and Stow was incorporated in 1732 as Harvard. A large section of West Concord won approval of the General Court and incorporated as Acton on July 3, 1735.

Through the 1700s, Littleton like most new towns was served by several taverns, which were a fixture of small New England towns through to the early twentieth century:

- The Long Store which was on Great Road across from the new Littleton Police Station was built around 1700.
- The Fox Tavern, 35 Foster Street, was also built around 1700.
- The Lawrence Tavern, also known as the Hartwell Tavern, was built on Crane Rd off Liberty Square in 1768.

In 1742, the Meetinghouse was moved to a new building (the present site of the Unitarian Church) at a cost of £900. This would be the community's only house of worship for the remainder of the 1700s.

Construction of Warren's Grist Mill (abutting 495 at the junction of Mill Rd and Warren St) began in 1750. This mill processed the crops produced by the town residents through the eighteenth century.

Residents of Littleton contributed men to the militia system that was set up by the Crown to serve as self-defense against hostile First Nations peoples as well as the French in Canada. Men from Littleton served in the primarily Provincial Army that captured Louisbourg in 1745. This militia system evolved into the organization that confronted the British Regulars on April 18, 1775.

The minutemen and militia of Littleton marched and fought at Concord and the Battle Road on April 19, 1775. The militia company and the minutemen squads mustered at Liberty Square, located on the southwest side of town on the Boxborough line (then part of Littleton). They marched from there through what is now Boxborough Depot and over Littleton Rd/Boxborough Rd to Newtown Road (Littleton), up over Fort Pond Hill (stopping briefly at the Choate Farm) and along Newtown Rd (Acton) to Acton Center. From there they marched the Isaac Davis Trail to Old North Bridge. Some writing suggests that the minutemen sped ahead to join the other minutemen at the bridge.

In 1782, the third request to incorporate as a separate town by the residents of present day Boxborough was granted by the General Court and incorporated on February 25, 1783, taking away almost a quarter of Littleton's area on the south abutting Stow and Harvard.

In 1795, the town built its first public schools which served the children of Littleton until 1870:

- North School House, Old Great Road
- East Schoolhouse 540 Newtown Road
- South School House, 279 Foster Street
- West Schoolhouse, Sanderson Road

According to local lore, the town had a contingent of Loyalists who remained after the revolution and thwarted attempts to rename King Street as Main, Washington, or Adams streets. This has been the source of ribbing from neighboring towns, who call Littleton a Tory town.

=== 19th century ===
During the 1800s, Littleton grew at a slow pace. It became known for its apple orchards and the cider produced in town. The Warren Gristmill changed over to operating as a sawmill in the second decade.

In 1822, Baptists in town decided to create their own society and build a church at the corner of King Street and Goldsmith Street. This was influenced by Unitarianism beginning to take hold in New England.

The lyceum movement, a Scottish and English means of spreading education; especially in the sciences to the masses came to Littleton when, following the example of Millbury, Salem, and Concord, Littletonians on December 21, 1829, decided, in their words, "to promote mutual improvement" through the formation of the Littleton Lyceum. By the time of its 25th anniversary, the Littleton Lyceum took the form and operation it would have for almost a century of lectures followed by questions and debate. During the Civil War or shortly thereafter, most lyceums petered out, but not in Littleton. Besides bringing about a brief return to public debating, the War was also long a subject for Lyceum, a venue where veterans lectured about their experiences and travel.

In 1840, the community fractured on sectarian lines. As a result the remaining members of the town meetinghouse, now Unitarians, realized that they needed a larger building and funded it by selling pews to the members. The Orthodox Congregational Society funded their building in the same manner the same year, 1841. The two churches have occupied their locations on Foster and King Streets to the present day.

The industrial revolution continued in Littleton with the arrival of the Fitchburg Railroad in 1844. The original station was built in 1845. A new train station was erected in 1879 and was used until it closed in 1970. This line served to be influential in the development of the town. Commuter service into North Station along this line began in the 1880s.

The Fitchburg was not the only railroad to arrive and serve Littleton in the Nineteenth Century. The Stony Brook Railroad line running from present day Ayer to Chelmsford maintained a station in North Littleton by Forge Pond. Just over the line in North Acton, there was also a passenger station with service on the Framingham and Lowell Railroad beginning in 1871.

With the railroads, local farmers grew in response to the availability of transport for their produce to markets in Boston. Some of the local farmers located along the rail line began to diversify their crops for sale in Haymarket, a few farms began to concentrate on dairy production, but Littleton became known for the number of orchards producing apples.

Abolitionism and Transcendentalism became popular movements in Littleton during the 1800s and were much discussed at Littleton Lyceum. Several Littleton men served in the Federal forces during the Civil War and are memorialized on a plaque on either side of the Houghton Memorial Building.

Further development of stores, shops, and business centered on the Common and the now growing Depot. By the common, the Conant Houghton Co. Mill was erected in 1880. Initially, it processed apple products, but moved into the production of clothing and military equipment in the late 1890s. In 1885, the quarantine station for the Port of Boston moved from Waltham to a farm on the Fitchburg railway line on the south west side of Mill Pond. Used to clear wild and domestic animals and made Littleton a center for horse-dealing and training.

In 1894-95, the Houghton Memorial Building was designed by Perkins & Betton and built to house the municipal library. It was a gift from Elizabeth and Clement S. Houghton, he was the son of one of Boston's wealthiest merchants, William S. Houghton. The elder Houghton, a Littleton native, had in 1884 made a bequest to the town for the establishment of a library collection in honor of Reuben Hoar, who had financially assisted his father in a difficult time.

=== 20th century ===
Littleton continued to grow through the twentieth century. Prior to World War I, the mill at the common moved into the manufacturing of military webbing to supply the US Armed Forces. The advent of the war drew more people to town to work in the mill. Young men from Littleton also left to serve during the war. Upon their return, they founded the two veterans' posts, American Legion Post 249 and VFW Post 6556.

With the advent of the automobile, Littleton saw two more expansions of agri-business. The existing dairy farms grew larger and became commercial. Cloverdale Farm/Dell Dale Farm, on Mannion Place off Great Road edging up to the shores of Lake Nagog, became a well-known local dairy operating until 1986, first by John Mannion and then Thomas and William Byrne from Hopedale. Herbert Whitcomb also ran a commercial dairy, which he sold in 1942 to J. Fred Herpy, a dairyman who had moved to Littleton from Rome, New York. Herpy relocated the pasteurizing business to Great Road in 1952. Business was good in the post-war years, and Herpy's Dairy thrived.

On the site of the Great Road plant, Herpy built two large swimming pools, and added a bathhouse, grill and ice cream stand. The pools provided swimming lessons to the residents of Littleton and surrounding towns. By the last year the pools were open, 1968, over a thousand children learned to swim at Herpy's. It closed a year later, in response to Littleton's expansion of alcohol sales.

Like many towns along the state roads radiating from Boston, the advent of motor transport saw the arrival of truck farms which sprang up along Route 119/2A. These were market gardens that were operated on a large scale to supply produce for Haymarket in Boston. While earlier commercial market gardens had sprung up along the railways, motor transport allowed the formation of produce wholesalers in outlying cities such as Fitchburg and Lowell which signed contracts with local farmers to provide goods on a daily basis for sale in Haymarket. The trucks would leave the yards and drive down the state roads buying produce from the farms for resale in town. Almost all truck farms kept a portion of their produce for sale at their roadside stands. The farms in Littleton were operated by a mix of older Yankee residents and newer Irish, Italian, Quebecois, and Greek families who had bought the farms as a commercial venture. One can see what most of Route 2A looked like running in through Acton, Concord, Lexington, and Arlington during the first two-thirds of the century by looking at present day, Route 119 moving northwest from Beaver Brook Road.

Arthur Rowse bought Standard Vinegar Co. in Somerville, in 1865 in 1900, changed the name to New England Vinegar Works in 1907. In 1919, he added the Veryfine brand name for pasteurized apple juice. He moved the company to Littleton, Massachusetts, in 1930 to be closer to Massachusetts' apple orchards, setting up his plant at the Depot. While in Somerville, Arthur Rowse, known for integrity and honesty, had refused to do business with bootleggers in a state where Prohibition was overwhelmingly unpopular. He continued his refusal after moving to Littleton.

Due to the Yankee character of the town, it was notably dry during Prohibition. Although Prohibition was repealed in 1933, Littleton did not permit the sale of alcohol again until 1960, and then in just two locations, the Johnson's store at the Depot and the Nashoba Package store at Donelan's shopping center. Only in the late 1980s, with the building of DEC's King Street facility, was a bar allowed to open in town (this later became Ken's American Cafe, which closed in December 2008. It was followed by what is now the Chip Shot on Ayer Road). For years, residents could go to establishments just over the town line that served alcohol, in the surrounding Acton, Westford, Groton, Ayer, and Boxborough.

Littleton has remained a predominantly Yankee town, with the bulk of the population belonging to the Congregational Church of Littleton, The First Baptist Church, and First Church Unitarian churches. In the post-World War II era, Roman Catholic immigrants from Ireland, Quebec, Canada, and Italy moved into Middlesex County and Littleton. The Roman Catholic parish of St. Anne's was established in 1947 and is currently the largest congregation in town. The Church of Jesus Christ of Latter-day Saints established a chapel in 1979. In 1956, the Church of Christ was built on Harwood Avenue. It disbanded in 1985 due to the closing of Ft. Devens and the resultant dwindling membership.

Many of the early families are represented by descendants in the town to the present day: Blanchard, Bulkeley, Crane, Hartwell, Hathaway, Kimball, and Whitcomb. The neighborhoods around Mill Pond (also known as Lake Warren): Long Lake, Forge Village, and Spectacle Pond, include numerous summer cottages or "camps" that have been converted into year-round residences. Many ethnic Irish, Italian, Québécois, and Finnish families moved here in the 1950s and 1960s in a kind of suburbanization after leaving their more dense, first and second-generation neighborhoods in Arlington, East Boston, Cambridge, Lowell, and Somerville.

Due to its location between Fort Devens and Hanscom AFB, Littleton has been a popular location for military retirees from the 1960s to the present day.

Author John Hanson Mitchell wrote a book titled Ceremonial Time (1984), which details a history of fifteen thousand years over one square mile located within the town.

The arrival of Digital Equipment Corporation (DEC, later part of Hewlett-Packard) in the 1970s connected the town to other businesses in the Boston-area high-tech corridor. Digital built a very large facility on King Street near the Common, as well as offices on Porter Road and Foster Street.

=== 21st century ===
In 2007, IBM purchased the King Street facility from Hewlett-Packard and announced that it would become its main New England location.

In 2014, Littleton embarked on a year of celebration for its 300th anniversary.

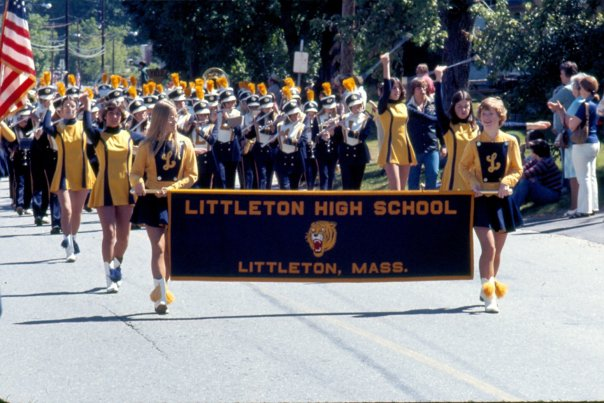
High school band on Memorial Day 1977

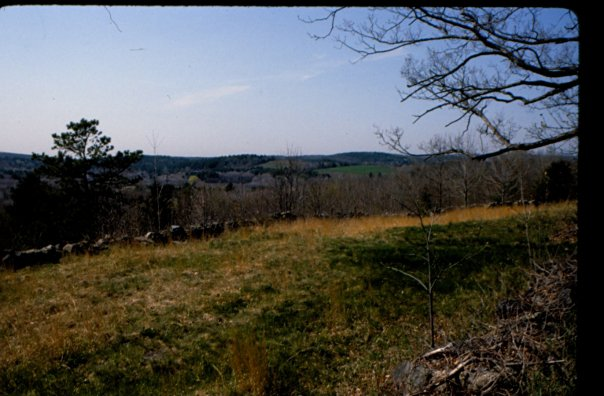
1962 view of Newtown Hill from Fort Pond Hill

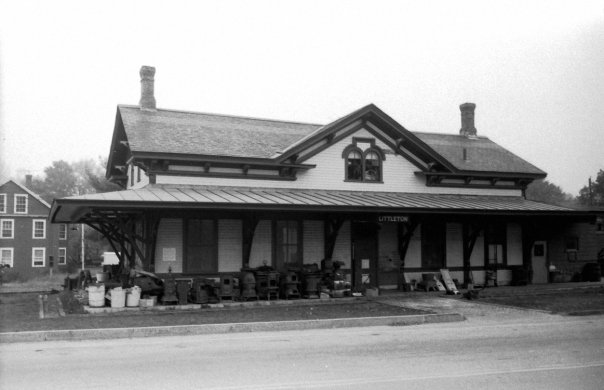
Littleton Station 1981

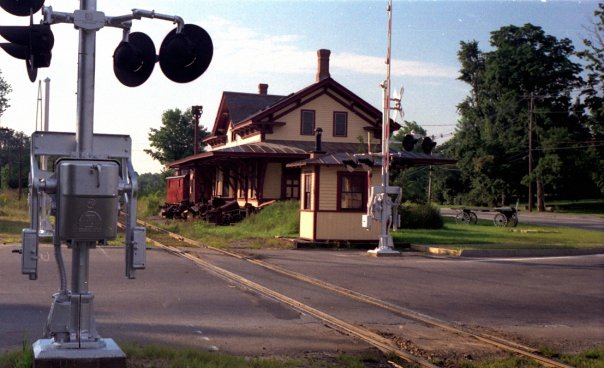
1972 view of Depot

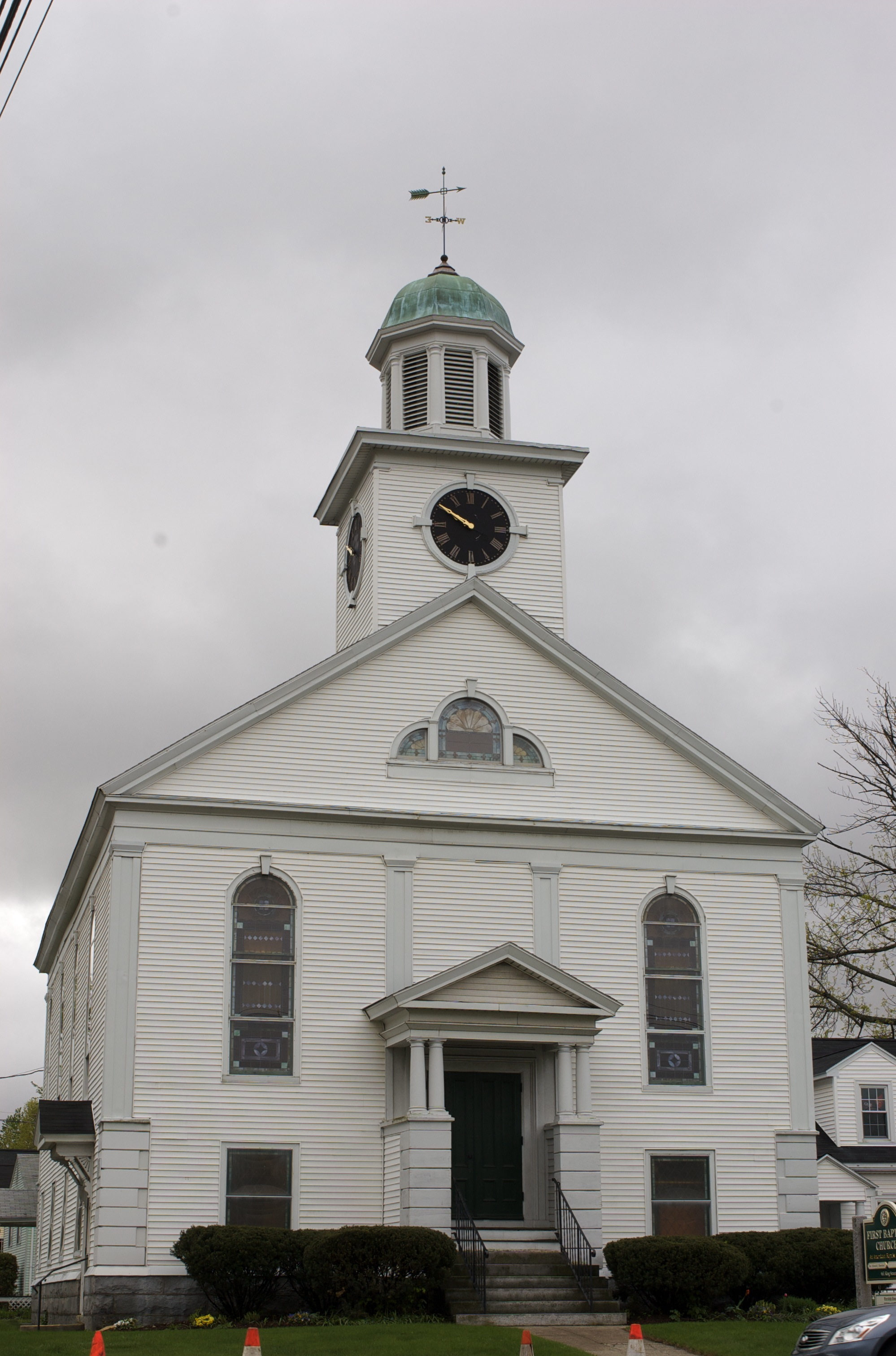
First Baptist Church of Littleton

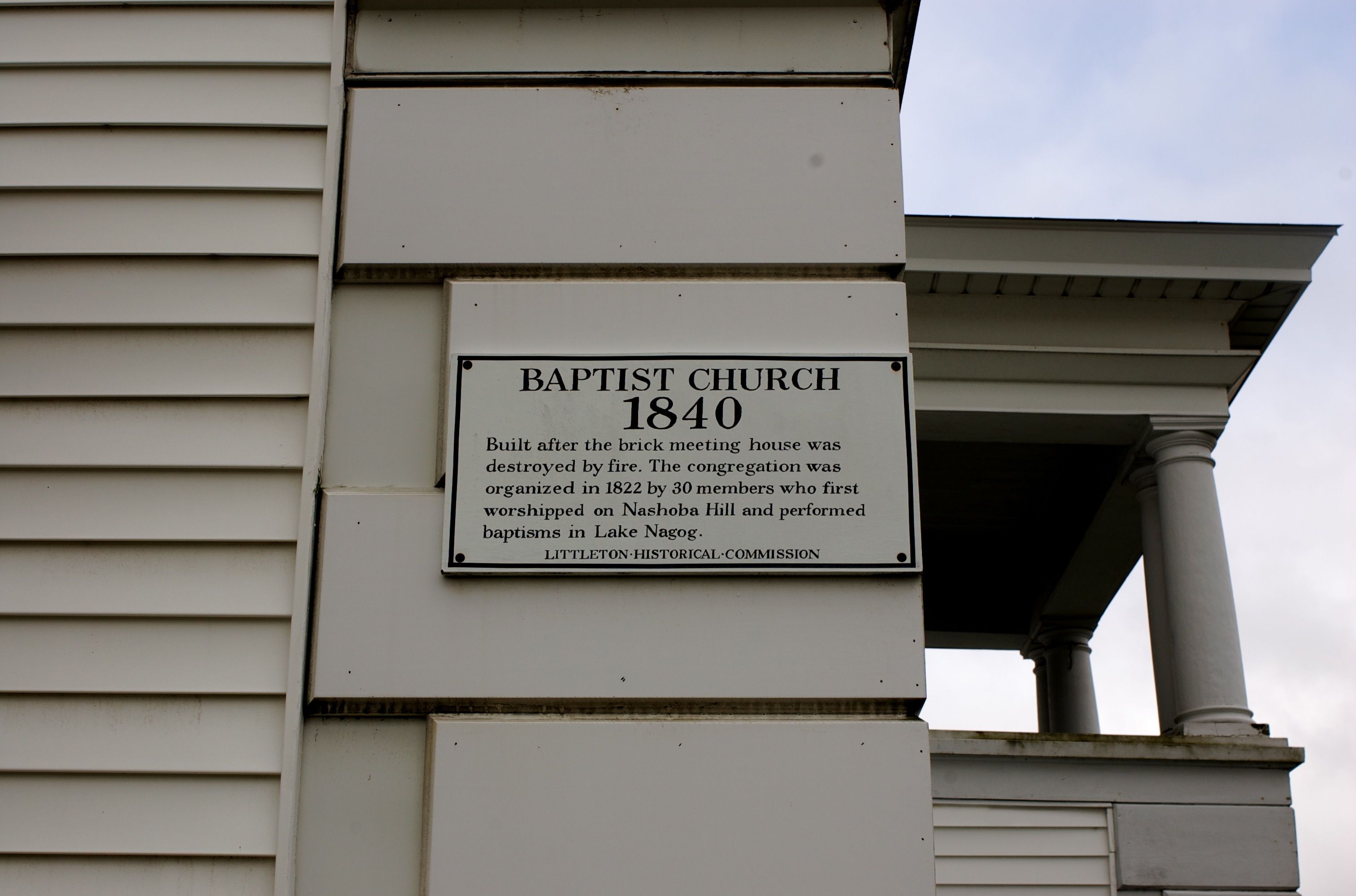
History of the First Baptist Church

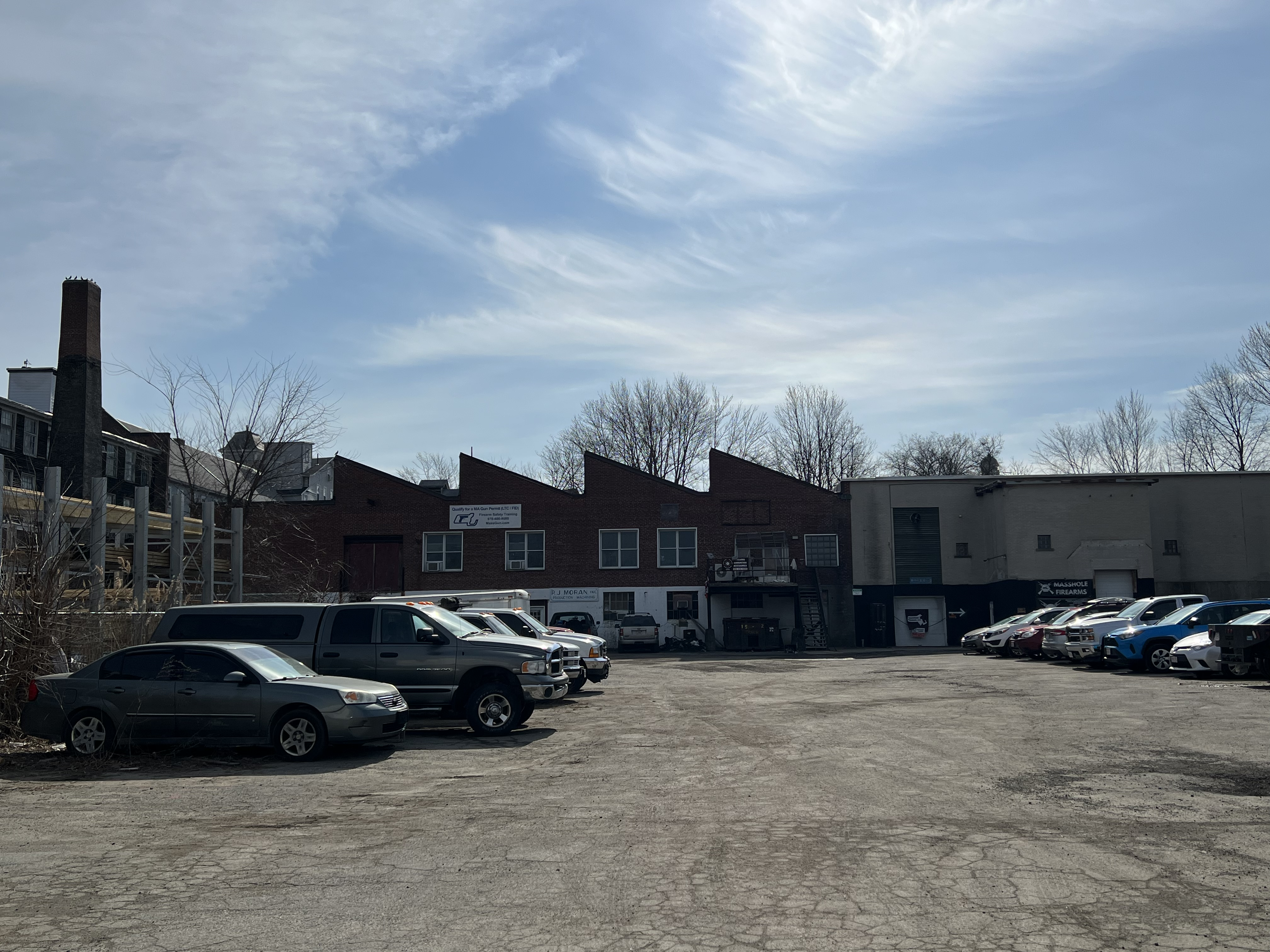
The Littleton mill in 2023

== Geography ==
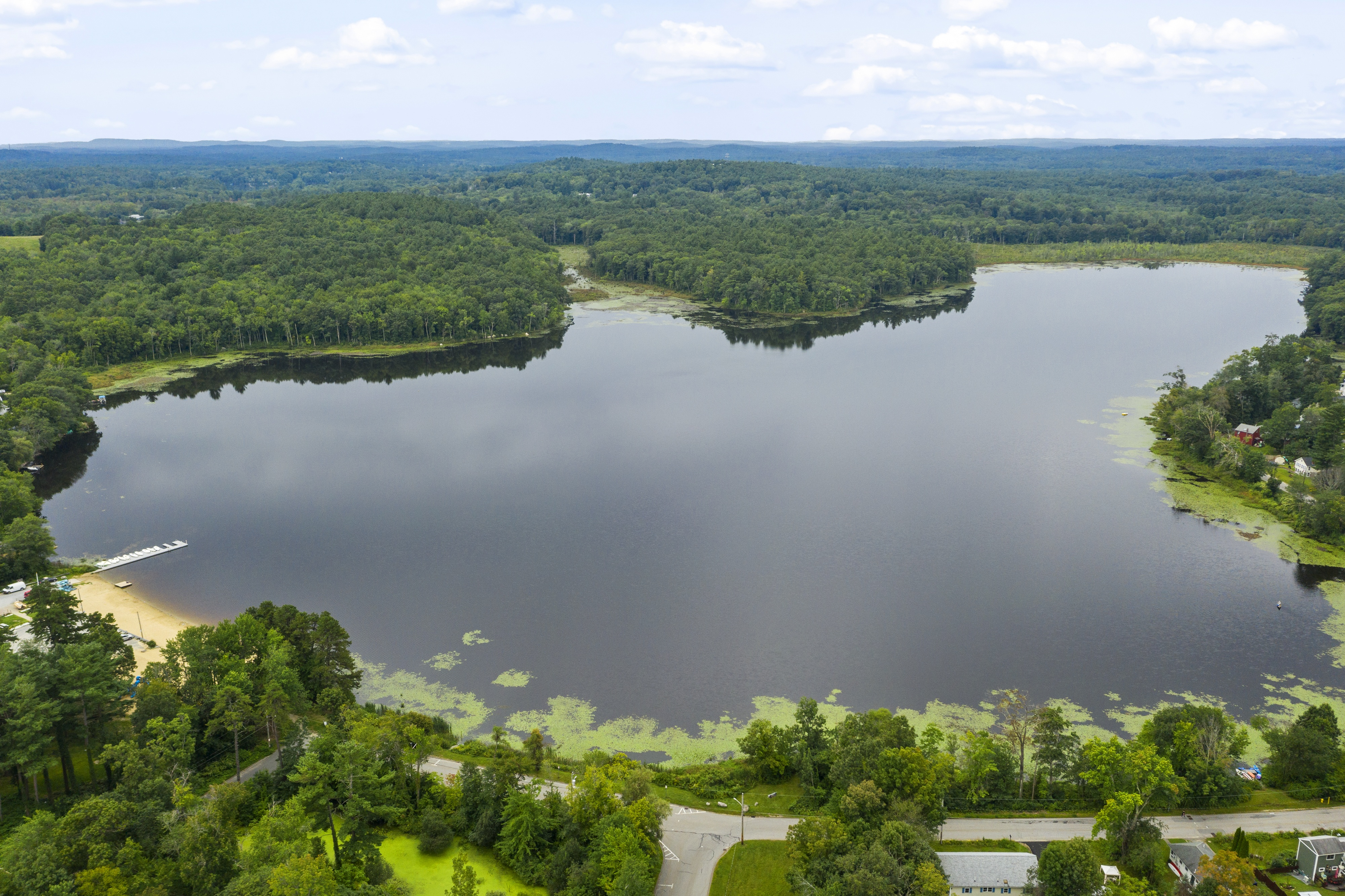
Long pond in Littleton

According to the United States Census Bureau, the town has a total area of 17.5 square miles (45 km^{2}), of which 16.6 square miles (43 km^{2}) is land and 0.9 square miles (2.3 km^{2}), or 5.30%, is water.

Littleton borders the following towns: Groton, Westford, Acton, Boxborough, Harvard, and Ayer.

== Demographics ==
Historical population
| Year | Pop. | ±% |
|---|---|---|
| 1790 | 854 | — |
| 1850 | 987 | +15.6% |
| 1860 | 1,063 | +7.7% |
| 1870 | 986 | −7.2% |
| 1880 | 994 | +0.8% |
| 1890 | 1,025 | +3.1% |
| 1900 | 1,179 | +15.0% |
| 1910 | 1,229 | +4.2% |
| 1920 | 1,277 | +3.9% |
| 1930 | 1,447 | +13.3% |
| 1940 | 1,651 | +14.1% |
| 1950 | 2,349 | +42.3% |
| 1960 | 5,109 | +117.5% |
| 1970 | 6,380 | +24.9% |
| 1980 | 6,970 | +9.2% |
| 1990 | 7,051 | +1.2% |
| 2000 | 8,184 | +16.1% |
| 2010 | 8,924 | +9.0% |
| 2020 | 10,141 | +13.6% |
| 2023* | 10,251 | +1.1% |
* = population estimate.

At the 2020 census, there were 10,141 people, 3,657 households and 2,218 families residing in the town. The population density was 492.5 inhabitants per square mile (190.2/km^{2}). There were 3,889 housing units at an average density of 183.8 per square mile (71.0/km^{2}). The racial makeup of the town was 80.71% White, 1.34% African American, 0.15% Native American, 8.17% Asian, 0.02% Pacific Islander, 1.33% from other races, and 5.03% from two or more races. Hispanic or Latino of any race were 3.25% of the population.

There were 3,657 households, of which 23.2% had children under the age of 18 living with them, 64.0% were married couples living together, 22.1% had a female householder with no spouse present, 10.3% had a male householder with no spouse present, and 3.6% were non-families. Of all households 19.6% were made up of individuals, and 8.2% had someone living alone who was 65 years of age or older. The average household size was 2.72 and the average family size was 3.16.

Of the population 23.2% were under the age of 18, 5.5% from 18 to 24, 30.3% from 25 to 44, 25.7% from 45 to 64, and 15.3% who were 65 years of age or older. The median age was 44.7 years. For every 100 females, there were 96.7 males. For every 100 females age 18 and over, there were 94.3 males.

The median household income was $123,413 and the median family income was $143,233. About 2.4% of families and 3.6% of the population were below the poverty line, including 1.9% of those under age 18 and 5.2% of those age 65 or over.

== Education ==
=== Littleton public schools ===
- Littleton High School
- Littleton Middle School
- Russell Street School
- Shaker Lane School

=== Other public schools ===
- Nashoba Valley Technical High School: public regional vocational technical high school located in Westford.
- Francis W. Parker Charter Essential School: a public charter school in Devens that serves students in grades 7 to 12.

=== Private or parochial schools ===
- Academy of Notre Dame: co-educational Roman Catholic elementary school, K1 through 8th grade, in Tyngsborough, and an all-girls Roman Catholic preparatory school for grades 9–12 run by the Sisters of Notre Dame de Namur
- Applewild School: established in 1957, a private, independent co-educational day school for grades preschool – 8th grade located in Fitchburg.
- Concord Academy: a private, co-educational, independent, college preparatory school for grades 9–12, located in Concord.
- Country Day School of the Holy Union: coeducational Roman Catholic elementary school, Pre-K through 8th grade, in Groton run by the Sisters of the Holy Union.
- The Fenn School: an all-boys private school in Concord, serving grades 4–9.
- Groton School: a private, Episcopal, college preparatory boarding school for grades 9–12 located in Groton.
- Lawrence Academy at Groton: a private, co-educational preparatory school for grades 9–12 located in Groton.
- Middlesex School: a private, independent preparatory school for grades 9–12 located in Concord.
- Nashoba Brooks School: an independent co-educational school for Pre-K (age 3) through 3rd grade and all-female from grade 4th through 8th grade.
- Oak Meadow School: a private, independent Montessori school serving Pre-K (18 months through 8th grade) is the only private school located within Littleton.

=== Library ===
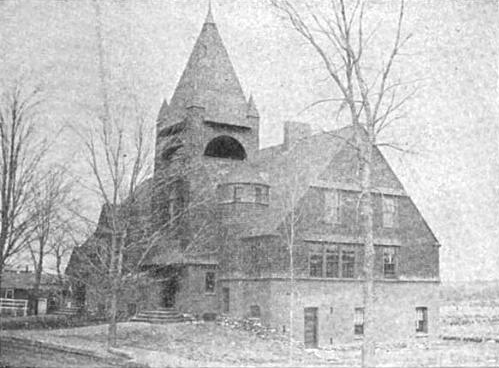
Reuben Hoar public library, Littleton, 1891

The public Reuben Hoar Library first opened in 1887. In 1895, the Houghton Memorial Building was constructed, and the Reuben Hoar Library moved into it. The library, still named in honor of Reuben Hoar, moved to 41 Shattuck Street in 1991, and the Houghton Memorial Building then housed the Littleton Historical Society. In November 2021, the Ruben Hoar Library moved to 35 Shattuck Street. In fiscal year 2008, the town of Littleton spent 1.5% ($432,744) of its budget on its public library—approximately $49 per person, per year ($60.01 adjusted for inflation in 2021).

== Media ==
The local newspaper is called the Littleton Independent.

Littleton Community Television (LCTV) has a new and improved studio at 37 Shattuck Street behind the town offices at the Littleton Town Hall.

== Historical, civic, and cultural organizations ==
Littleton, like other small towns, has many local charities and organizations that are active in the town. Non-profit town-specific groups include the Littleton Conservation Trust, the Littleton Country Gardeners, and Littleton Historical Society (a non-profit partner to the town's Historical Commission). The Littleton Lyceum and the Indian Hill Music Center are two of the local cultural organizations. The Littleton Rotary Club is active in community development/service. Local fraternal organizations that serve the town of Littleton are the Tahattawan Masonic Lodge, the Bishop Ruocco Council 9275 Knights of Columbus, the Acton Lions Club, and the Chelmsford and Maynard Elks. Charity groups serving Littleton are the Loaves and Fishes Food Pantry at Devens, the Acton Community Food Pantry, Habitat for Humanity, and the St. Vincent de Paul Society. Finally, local veterans have two posts, American Legion Post 249 and Veterans of Foreign Wars Post 6556 co-located at the Post in the Depot.

== Houses of worship ==
Littleton was, like most small colonial New England towns, formed around a congregation of a house of worship. Following the horrific demise of the Praying Indian village of Nashoba, Anglo settlers and immigrants bought land from the surviving members of the Nashoba congregation and built their meetinghouse in 1715 on the site of what is now the First Church Unitarian, at 19 Foster St.

The First Baptist Church Littleton, at 461 King St, was the second congregation in Littleton built in spring of 1822 because "Prayer meetings on weekdays, itinerant preaching, and all efforts for the conversion of the heathen, were stigmatized as the doings of fanatics." (Note: Of note, from 1831-1834, For the next three years the church was supplied with preaching chiefly by the students of Newton Theological Institution.) In 1841, more Calvinists, following the Congregational doctrine decided that the main congregation had moved too far away from Calvinism but did not agree with the Baptists, split off, and built what is now the Congregational Church of Littleton, UCC, at 330 King St. Littleton Protestant churches remained the only ones in town until the twentieth century.

The next creed to establish itself in Littleton was Roman Catholicism driven by the influx of Irish, Italian, Quebecois, Polish, Norwegian, and Portuguese immigrants. The first Mass offered in Littleton at the Town Hall Christmas Day 1911. Littleton's first Catholic Church was established in 1916, with its patron Saint Anne. At that time, forty Catholic families resided in Littleton. (Note: The land for the building was bought on King Street (interestingly, the building is now the current site of the Tahattawan Masonic Lodge) from Sherman Jewett. With seating for 208, it was finished spring 1916.) Serving as a mission to St Mary's in Ayer, it became its own parish in 1945. By the late 1950s, the congregation had grown larger so they built the present building at 75 King St and relocated there in 1960.

During the Cold War, an increasing number of Mormons moved into the area. With evangelization and this influx, the local Mormon community built the Littleton Ward of The Church of Jesus Christ of Latter-day Saints at 616 Reat Road in the 1980s.

The town has an ecumenical group, The Greater Littleton Interfaith Council, which cooperates on various charity, faith, and relief activities. In addition to the resident congregations, the council works with congregations in surrounding towns.

Other religions in Littleton are served by Wat Buddhabhavana (Buddhist) in Westford, Church of the Good Shepherd (Episcopalian) in Acton, Congregation Beth Elohim (Judaism) in Acton, Shirdi Sai Temple (Hinduism) in Groton, Islamic Community Center in Acton, Mt Calvary Lutheran Church in Acton, and St Matthews United Methodist Church in Acton.

== Transportation ==
Commuter rail service from Boston's North Station is provided by the MBTA with a stop in Littleton on its Fitchburg Line. The LRTA 15 bus line ends in the IBM parking lot. Other transportation services in Littleton are provided by the regional transit authority MART.

Freight travels daily through Littleton over the tracks of the historic Stony Brook Railroad. The line currently serves as a major corridor of Pan Am Railway's District 3 which connects New Hampshire and Maine with western Massachusetts, Vermont, and New York.

Littleton has I-495, Route 2, Route 2A, Route 110, and Route 119.

== Notable people ==
- Shawn Andrews, actor
- Ron Borges, sports writer for the Boston Herald
- Jeanne Munn Bracken, author and journalist
- Steve Carell, worked as a mail carrier in the town before going to The Second City
- Levi L. Conant, mathematician and developer of the Number Concept in 1896
- Ed Fletcher, politician who served as California State Senator until 1947
- Lucie Caroline Hager (1853–1903), author
- Alonzo Hartwell, engraver and portrait painter; father of Henry W. Hartwell
- Henry W. Hartwell, architect with Hartwell and Richardson
- Margaret Harwood, astronomer
- Greg Hawkes, keyboard player for the 1970s–1980s New Wave group The Cars, lived in Littleton during the band's early years before moving to Lincoln
- Jim Hollister, historian and National Park Service ranger
- Erik P. Kraft, author and illustrator
- Sean McAdam, sports writer for ESPN and The Providence Journal
- John Hanson Mitchell, author
- Tom Nepanet, husband of Sarah Doublet and emissary during King Philip's War
- Jonathan Prescott, a British officer
- Harrison Reed, governor of Florida until 1899
- Peleg Sprague, New Hampshire politician who served as a U.S. Senator until 1835 and a US District Court Judge until 1865
