= Houghton Memorial Building =

- U.S. National Register of Historic Places
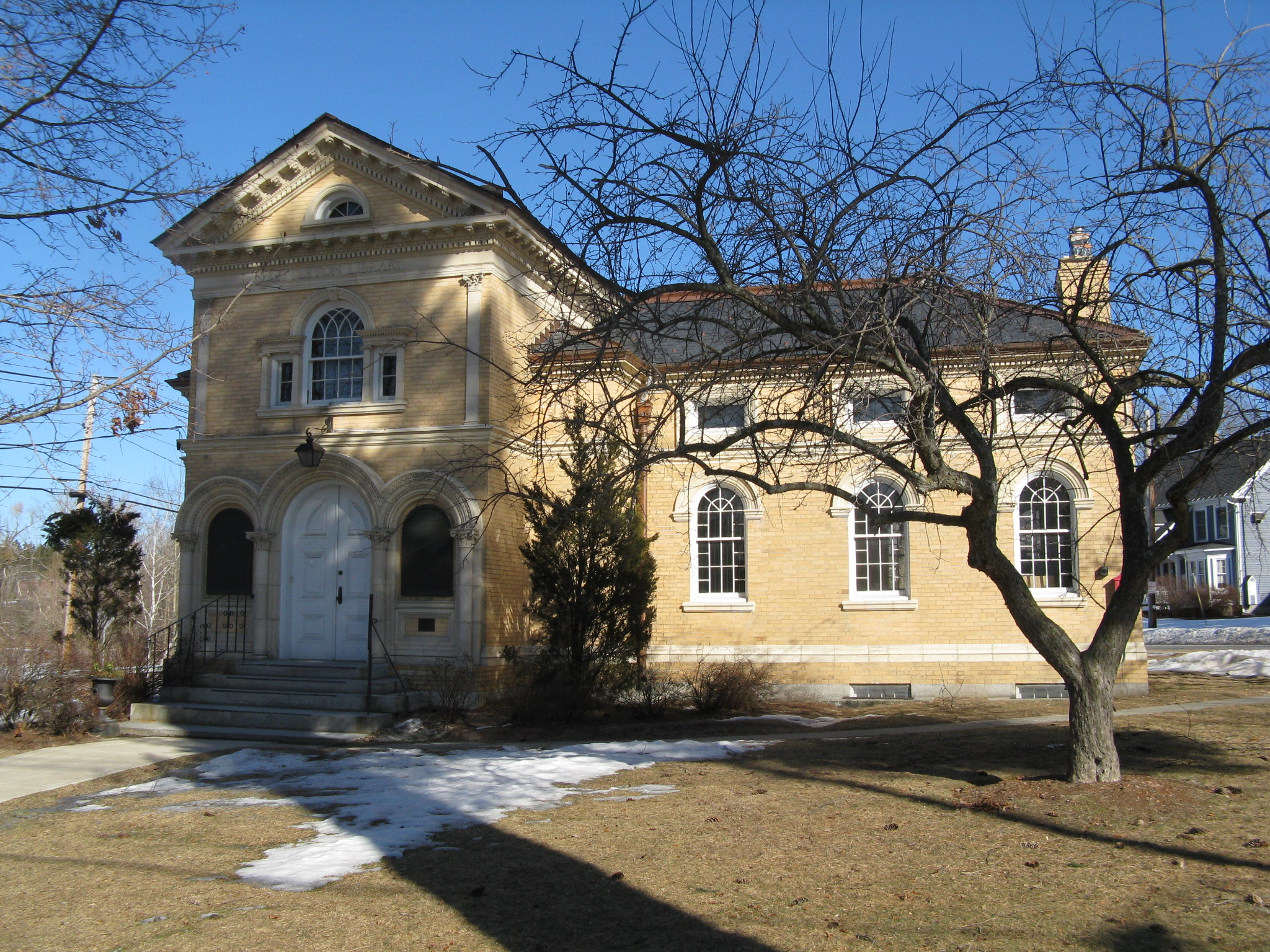
- Houghton Memorial Building/Littleton Historical Society

- Location within Massachusetts Location within the United States
- Location: Littleton, Massachusetts
- Coordinates: 42°32′20″N 71°29′3″W
- Built: 1895
- Architect: Perkins & Betton
- Architectural style: Colonial Revival
- NRHP reference No.: 91000242
- Added to NRHP: March 18, 1991

The Houghton Memorial Building is a historic civic building at 4 Rogers Street in Littleton, Massachusetts. Built in 1895 to a design by Perkins & Betton, this Colonial Revival style housed the local public library for many years. It presently houses the Littleton Historical Society. The building was listed on the National Register of Historic Places on March 18, 1991.

== Description and history ==
The Houghton Memorial Building occupies a triangular parcel of land at the junction of King and Foster Streets, southwest of Littleton's modern center. King Street (Massachusetts Route 2A) passes north of the building and Rogers Street is a short spur joining it to Foster Street. This area was historically the town center, and the building occupies a highly prominent position. It is a 1-1/2 story building, constructed out of yellow brick and a light-colored terra cotta. Its main entrance is in a pavilion 2-1/2 stories in height that projects from the northern end of the west side. It has a fully pedimented gable with modillions and dentil molding. The entrance is set in a round-arch opening, flanked by windows set in lower round-arch openings, with a three-part Palladian window on the second level. Courses of terra cotta extend around the building, separating the basement level from the first floor, and the first from the second. Windows on the first floor are typically round-arch sash. The building's interior has retained a significant degree of original material.

The building was designed by Perkins & Betton and built in 1894-95 to house the municipal library. It was a gift from Elizabeth and Clement S. Houghton, he the son of one of Boston's wealthiest merchants, William S. Houghton. The elder Houghton, a Littleton native, had in 1884 made a bequest to the town for the establishment of a library collection in honor of Reuben Hoar, who had financially assisted his father in a difficult time. The Shingle style building erected by that bequest stood at the site of the present town hall, and also housed town offices. It was a major local landmark until its destruction by fire in 1943. The library, still named in honor of Reuben Hoar, moved to 41 Shattuck Street in 1991, and the Houghton Memorial Building then housed the Littleton Historical Society.

== See also ==
- Conant Houghton Co. Building
- National Register of Historic Places listings in Middlesex County, Massachusetts
