= Lucie Caroline Hager =

American author

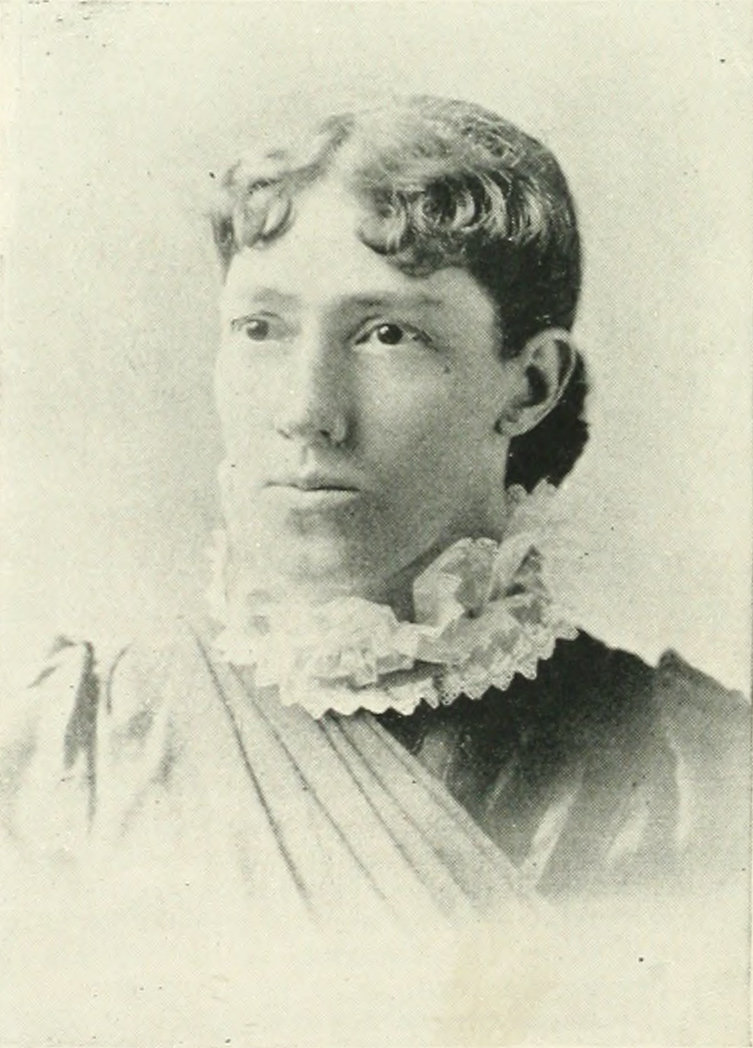
- Photo in A Woman of the Century
- Born: Lucie Caroline Gilson; December 29, 1853; Littleton, Massachusetts, US
- Died: 1903 (aged 49–50); Boxborough, Massachusetts
- Education: Normal School, Framingham, Massachusetts
- Occupation: Writer
- Spouse: Simon B. Hager (m. 1882)
- Children: 1 son
- Writing career
- Genres: Poetry, short stories, non-fiction
- Subject: history articles

Signature
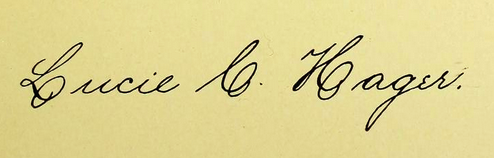

Lucie Caroline Hager (née Gilson; December 29, 1853 – 1903) was an American author, poet, teacher, and bookkeeper from Massachusetts. She published poetry and prose in various periodicals, often using the name "Lucie C. Gilson". Her work included religious and nature-themed poems, several of which appeared in collections, as well as short stories and a local history of her town. In addition to her literary pursuits, Hager taught in country schools and worked as a bookkeeper during her early career. She lived for much of her adult life in Boxborough, Massachusetts, where she married and raised a family.

== Early life and education ==
Lucie Caroline Gilson was born in Littleton, Massachusetts, December 29, 1853. Her parents were Robert Dunn Gilson and Lydia Gilson. There were nine children in the family, of whom Lucie was the youngest.

Her education was acquired in adverse circumstances. Having entered the normal school in Framingham, Massachusetts, in 1875, she was recalled to her home during the first weeks of the school year, and her studies were exchanged for days of patient watching with the sick, or such employment as she could obtain near her home. Her first poems appeared at that time. With such private instruction as her country home afforded, she continued her studies.

== Career ==
She became a successful teacher of country schools and a bookkeeper.

Most of her poems appeared over the name "Lucie C. Gilson". Her poems show a deep insight into nature, and the experiences of the human heart. Many of them are religious in sentiment, and all have a high moral tone. Some evince poetic merit, and, as a collection, they would make an interesting, fair-sized, volume. "The Hills Beyond", "Faith", "Arbutus", and "Limerick Bells" are among her poems which deserve special mention. Several of her poems were included in collections. Her first published poem entitled, "We All Do Fade as a Leaf", appeared in the Watchman and Reflector, of Boston, in November, 1875. She wrote a number of short stories for the papers; her estimate of her own work was modest. She wrote and published the history of the town in which she resided, entitled Boxborough: A New England Town and its People.

== Personal life ==
In October, 1882, she married Simon B. Hager, of Boxborough, Massachusetts, in which town they resided thereafter, settling on the Whitman Wetherbee place. They had one son, Milton Blanchard, born August 15, 1888. She died in Boxborough, 1903.

== Selected works ==
=== Books ===
- Boxborough: a New England town Compiled for the Middlesex County History, with sketches and illustrations, additional. (1891)
- The brown thrasher; The wood warblers (1900)

=== Poems ===
- "We All Do Fade as a Leaf"
- "The Hills Beyond"
- "Faith"
- "Arbutus"
- "Limerick Bells"
