= Matt Shearer (reporter) =

Boston-area journalist

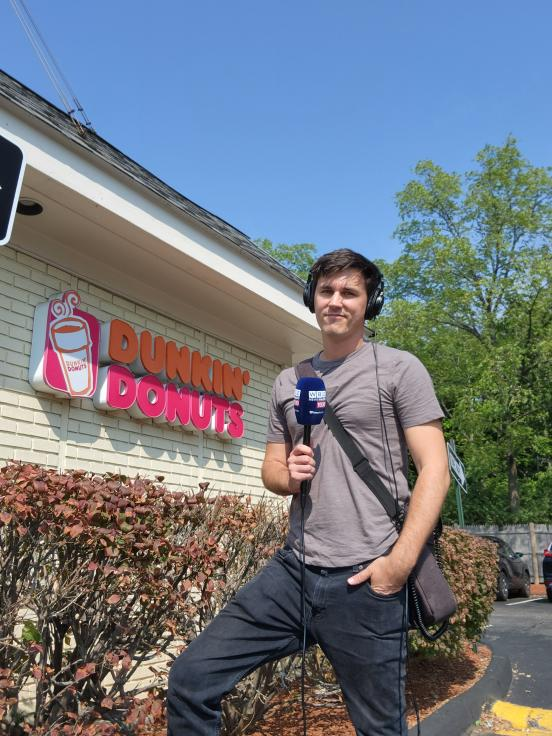
- Matt Shearer in front of Dunkin
- Education: Acton-Boxborough Regional High School; Emerson College
- Occupation: Journalist
- Years active: 2020–Present
- Employer: WBZ NewsRadio 1030
- Known for: Social media content

Instagram information
- Page: reportermatt
- Genre: Journalism
- Followers: 81.4k (January 25, 2025)

Notes
- Matt Shearer on Bluesky; WBZ NewsRadio on TikTok

Matt Shearer, also known as Reporter Matt, is a Massachusetts-based journalist who covers local stories in short-form videos on WBZ's social media accounts.

== Early life and career ==
Shearer is from Acton, Massachusetts. He graduated from Acton-Boxborough Regional High School in 2005, and attended Emerson College, where he began working at WERS. Shearer got started in radio working as a producer on the Jim and Margery Show on Boston's WTKK. He later worked for Boston's WBGB radio station on The TJ Show. As a producer, he created bits including interviewing strangers for person-on-the-street segments.

=== WBZ ===
In 2020, Shearer was hired to produce audio news stories for the Boston-based commercial AM news radio station WBZ. When his employer asked him to focus on video production for its fledgling TikTok channel, Shearer was initially reluctant. His work was quickly popular, focusing on hyperlocal stories, street interviews, landmarks, local businesses, and "small-town drama". When reporting, he wears headphones and a backpack of equipment. He uses a microphone, and records the videos with his iPhone. He spends time interviewing a wide range of people, recording audio continuously, then writes the story and inserts clips as appropriate.

Shearer's videos are known for their on-the-street interviews, local culture, and humorous content, with some, according to Boston Magazine, "more sketch comedy than vox pop", like a video about Boston's "most iconic cafes" in which Shearer recommends a number of different Dunkin' Donuts locations.

Original TikTok video about the Stow, Massachusetts, "Dunkin' desert"
- https://www.tiktok.com/@wbznewsradio/video/7142466989271960875

In 2022 Shearer produced a story about the "Dunkin' Desert" of Stow, Massachusetts. The restaurant chain Dunkin' Donuts is known for being widespread in the state, and when both locations in Stow closed, Shearer interviewed local residents about the loss. The video went viral, which Shearer attributed to the way it is both absurd to be upset at a mild inconvenience and also meaningful in the way it changes the daily life of residents. Dunkin' Donuts agreed to open a pop-up shop in response to the video. Another similarly themed video focused on residents' reactions when one of three Market Basket supermarkets on the same stretch of Boston Road in Billerica, Massachusetts, closed.

In a December 2023 story, Shearer came across a singer, Ara Bolster, struggling with homelessness in the Downtown Crossing area of Boston. His story about her, arranging for a recording session, and reunion with her daughter, received regional and national attention. In 2024, inspired by the New York-Dublin Portal, he set up a portal from Boston Common to Worcester Common, using laptops on folding tables, with the resulting video highlighting a friendly rivalry between the two cities.

Shearer was nominated for Boston/New England Emmy Award in the category Multimedia Journalist-Single Shift. According to Shearer, he did not realize he had to buy a ticket for the ceremony, so when the day came he stood outside with a sign saying he was nominated and needed a ticket. An interviewer for Poynter said that Shearer was "able to encapsulate what many of us carry for life: the pride, passion and even defensiveness of where one is from", succeeding at depicting small town life outside of Boston. Rhode Island PBS said his videos work because of his personality and "gift for making people want to talk to him".

Shearer's favorite story was tracking down the composer of the jingle for New Hampshire-based water park Water Country, Tom Russell, then learning he had never been to the park and doing a follow-up piece coordinating with the park to take him.
