= Bob Sweeney (ice hockey) =

American ice hockey player (born 1964)

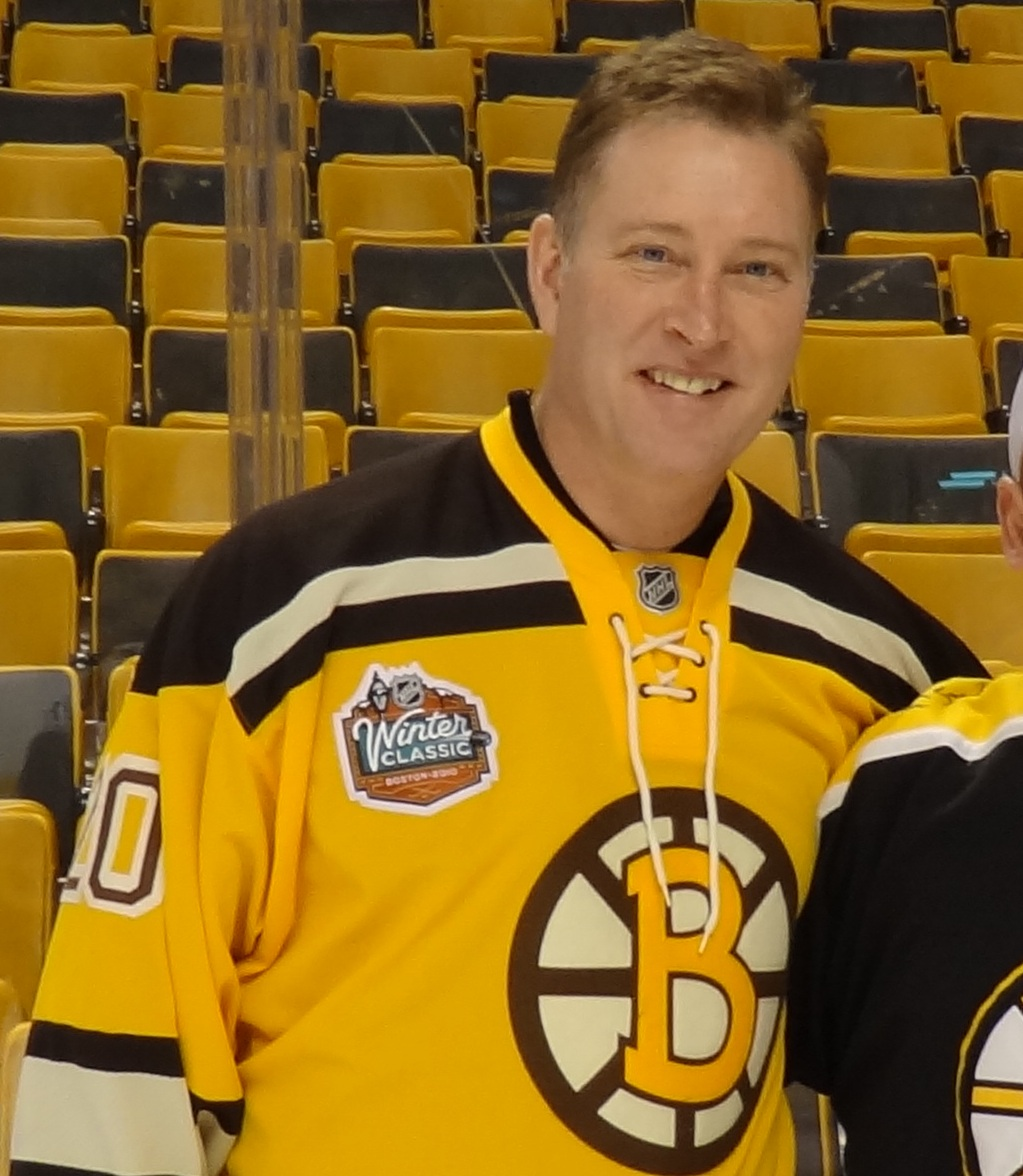
- Born: January 25, 1964 (age 62) Concord, Massachusetts, U.S.
- Height: 6 ft 3 in (191 cm)
- Weight: 200 lb (91 kg; 14 st 4 lb)
- Position: Center/Right wing
- Shot: Right
- Played for: Boston Bruins; Buffalo Sabres; New York Islanders; Calgary Flames
- National team: United States
- NHL draft: 123rd overall, 1982; Boston Bruins
- Playing career: 1986–2001

Robert Emmett Sweeney (born January 25, 1964) is an American former professional ice hockey center.

== Career ==
Sweeney was born at Emerson Hospital in Concord, Massachusetts, but grew up in Boxborough, Massachusetts. As a youth, he played in the 1976 Quebec International Pee-Wee Hockey Tournament with a minor ice hockey team from Assabet Valley. He was drafted out of high school by the Boston Bruins in the 1982 NHL entry draft, and went on to play four years at Boston College. He made his NHL debut in the 1986–87 season, but spent most of the year with the Bruins' AHL affiliate the Moncton Golden Flames. The 1987–88 season was Sweeney's first full year, a season where Boston traveled to the Stanley Cup Finals only to be swept by the Edmonton Oilers.

Following six seasons with Boston, Sweeney was claimed off waivers by the Buffalo Sabres in 1992 and then by the New York Islanders in the 1995 NHL Waiver Draft. After being traded to the Calgary Flames during the 1995–96 season, Sweeney retired from the NHL. He spent the next season in the IHL before traveling across the Atlantic to play in the Deutsche Eishockey Liga from 1997 until 2001. He is currently the executive director of the Boston Bruins Foundation.

== Awards and honors ==
Award	Year
All-Hockey East Second team	1984–85
AHCA East Second-Team All-American	1984–85

- Bob Sweeney Named Director of Development for the Boston Bruins Foundation - 2007

== Personal ==
Sweeney is the brother-in-law of Amy Sweeney, one of the flight attendants on American Airlines Flight 11, which hit the North Tower of the World Trade Center during the September 11, 2001 attacks.

== Career statistics ==
=== Regular season and playoffs ===
			Regular season					Playoffs
Season	Team	League	GP	G	A	Pts	PIM	GP	G	A	Pts	PIM
1979–80	Acton-Boxborough Regional High School	HS-MA	—	—	—	—	—	—	—	—	—	—
1980–81	Acton-Boxborough Regional High School	HS-MA	—	—	—	—	—	—	—	—	—	—
1981–82	Acton-Boxborough Regional High School	HS-MA	46	44	36	80	—	—	—	—	—	—
1982–83	Boston College	ECAC	30	17	11	28	10	—	—	—	—	—
1983–84	Boston College	ECAC	23	14	7	21	10	—	—	—	—	—
1984–85	Boston College	HE	44	32	32	64	43	—	—	—	—	—
1985–86	Boston College	HE	41	15	24	39	52	—	—	—	—	—
1986–87	Boston Bruins	NHL	14	2	4	6	21	3	0	0	0	0
1986–87	Moncton Golden Flames	AHL	58	29	26	55	81	4	0	2	2	13
1987–88	Boston Bruins	NHL	80	22	23	45	73	23	6	8	14	66
1988–89	Boston Bruins	NHL	75	14	14	28	99	10	2	4	6	19
1989–90	Boston Bruins	NHL	70	22	24	46	93	20	0	2	2	30
1990–91	Boston Bruins	NHL	80	15	33	48	115	17	4	2	6	45
1991–92	Boston Bruins	NHL	63	6	14	20	103	14	1	0	1	25
1991–92	Maine Mariners	AHL	1	1	0	1	0	—	—	—	—	—
1992–93	Buffalo Sabres	NHL	80	21	26	47	118	8	2	2	4	8
1993–94	Buffalo Sabres	NHL	60	11	14	25	94	1	0	0	0	0
1994–95	Buffalo Sabres	NHL	45	5	4	9	18	5	0	0	0	4
1995–96	New York Islanders	NHL	66	6	6	12	59	—	—	—	—	—
1995–96	Calgary Flames	NHL	6	1	1	2	6	2	0	0	0	0
1996–97	Québec Rafales	IHL	69	10	21	31	120	9	2	0	2	8
1997–98	Revierlöwen Oberhausen	DEL	27	9	4	13	77	—	—	—	—	—
1997–98	Frankfurt Lions	DEL	20	7	8	15	32	7	1	3	4	6
1998–99	Frankfurt Lions	DEL	46	6	21	27	30	1	0	1	1	8
1999–00	München Barons	DEL	37	9	21	30	63	12	3	5	8	20
2000–01	München Barons	DEL	33	3	11	14	50	11	1	0	1	8
NHL totals			639	125	163	288	799	103	15	18	33	197

=== International ===
Year	Team	Event	GP	G	A	Pts	PIM
1998	United States	WC Q	3	1	1	2	0
