= Robert A. Gilbert =

American nature photographer (1870–1942)

Robert Alexander Gilbert (c. 1870 – January 7, 1942) was an African-American nature photographer and museum assistant. For more than two decades he worked as field assistant and photographic collaborator to the ornithologist William Brewster, and afterward was employed at the Museum of Comparative Zoology (MCZ) at Harvard University until his death. Although his photographic contributions were largely uncredited during his lifetime, subsequent scholarship — in particular John Hanson Mitchell's biography Looking for Mr. Gilbert — has identified him as among the earliest known African-American landscape and nature photographers.

== Early life ==
Gilbert was born around 1870 in Natural Bridge, Virginia, in the valley of Broad Creek. In 1886, at the age of sixteen, he moved to Boston, Massachusetts, where he would live for the remainder of his life. During his first decade in Boston he held a series of jobs, including a position as a laboratory assistant to Dr. Arthur P. Chadbourne of Harvard Medical School, an amateur ornithologist and acquaintance of William Brewster.

== Work with William Brewster ==
Between 1895 and 1897, Chadbourne recommended Gilbert to Brewster, who needed temporary help setting up his personal bird museum on the grounds of his home in Cambridge, Massachusetts. After a ten-week initial engagement, Brewster hired Gilbert as his full-time assistant; Brewster's journals first mention Gilbert in an entry dated March 31, 1897. Gilbert remained in Brewster's employ until the ornithologist's death in 1919.

Gilbert's responsibilities were unusually varied. Glover M. Allen, Curator of Mammals at the MCZ, later described him as Brewster's "trusted assistant, looking after innumerable details at his museum or his camp, doing everything from photographic work to preparing and serving meals." Brewster's journals and diaries document Gilbert undertaking field observation, bird identification, specimen preparation, work at Brewster's cabin in Concord, Massachusetts, and pest inspection of museum collections. Gilbert was an Associate of the American Ornithologists' Union.

== Photographic work ==
During the 1890s Brewster was transitioning from collecting bird specimens with a shotgun to documenting wildlife by field observation and photography, and Gilbert — already knowledgeable in ornithology and skilled in photographic processing — became a key collaborator. Inscriptions on the reverse of surviving prints indicate that Gilbert owned darkroom equipment and produced prints from glass plate negatives.

The full extent of Gilbert's photographic output is unclear because most images in the collection were attributed by default to Brewster. Of more than 1,700 photographic prints in the Ernst Mayr Library of the MCZ, only six bear verso inscriptions explicitly identifying Gilbert as the photographer, including views of a wood-shed at Hemlock Grove in Concord (April 1904) and of Brewster's garden in Cambridge (July 1904). Scholars have suggested that many additional photographs in the collection may be Gilbert's work, and a cooperative research project between the Ernst Mayr Library and the Museum of American Bird Art at Mass Audubon is examining Brewster's digitized journals and diaries to clarify Gilbert's role.

The rediscovery of Gilbert's photographic contributions began in the mid-1970s, when author John Hanson Mitchell — then editor of Mass Audubon's Sanctuary magazine — found more than 2,000 of Brewster's glass plate negatives in the attic of a Massachusetts Audubon Society building. One image, depicting a young Black man in front of a rustic cabin, prompted Mitchell to investigate the subject's identity; he was later told by an MCZ archives assistant that the photographs had likely been taken by Brewster's assistant, Robert Gilbert. Mitchell's research culminated in the 2005 book Looking for Mr. Gilbert: The Reimagined Life of an African American, reissued in 2014 as Looking for Mr. Gilbert: The Unlikely Life of the First African American Landscape Photographer.

== Later career at the Museum of Comparative Zoology ==
Brewster arranged for the MCZ to employ Gilbert after his own death in 1919, and Gilbert continued working at the museum until 1942. Annual reports from the MCZ describe him supervising the rearrangement of exhibition halls and assisting with the preparation of skeletal material. deVeer and Rinaldo have noted that the range of tasks Gilbert performed would today be associated with the title of curatorial assistant.

== Death and legacy ==
Gilbert died on January 7, 1942, in Cambridge, Massachusetts. In the MCZ Annual Report for 1941–1942, director Thomas Barbour wrote a tribute describing Gilbert's "sterling personal characters of integrity, affection, courtesy, and loyalty."

Gilbert's contributions received renewed institutional recognition in the twenty-first century. In 2022, the Concord Museum and Mass Audubon mounted the exhibition Alive with Birds: William Brewster in Concord, which highlighted Gilbert's role as Brewster's longtime assistant and as an ornithologist and photographer in his own right. The Ernst Mayr Library has also undertaken digitization and transcription of Brewster's journals and diaries in part to clarify the scope of Gilbert's photographic and scientific contributions.
