= Acton-Boxborough Regional School District =

School district in Massachusetts, US

Address
- 16 Charter Road Acton, Middlesex County, Massachusetts, 01720; United States

District information
- Grades: PreK-12
- Superintendent of Schools: Peter Light
- Deputy superintendent(s): Andrew Shen

Students and staff
- Students: 5,697 (As of October 1, 2017)

Other information
- Website: www.abschools.org

Acton-Boxborough Regional School District (ABRSD) is a school district headquartered in Acton, Massachusetts, and serving Acton and Boxborough in the Boston metropolitan area.

== Schools ==
ABRSD has a preschool, three elementary schools (grades K-6), a junior high school (grades 7-8) and a high school (grades 9-12), all located just north of Massachusetts Avenue (Massachusetts Route 111) in Acton and Boxborough.

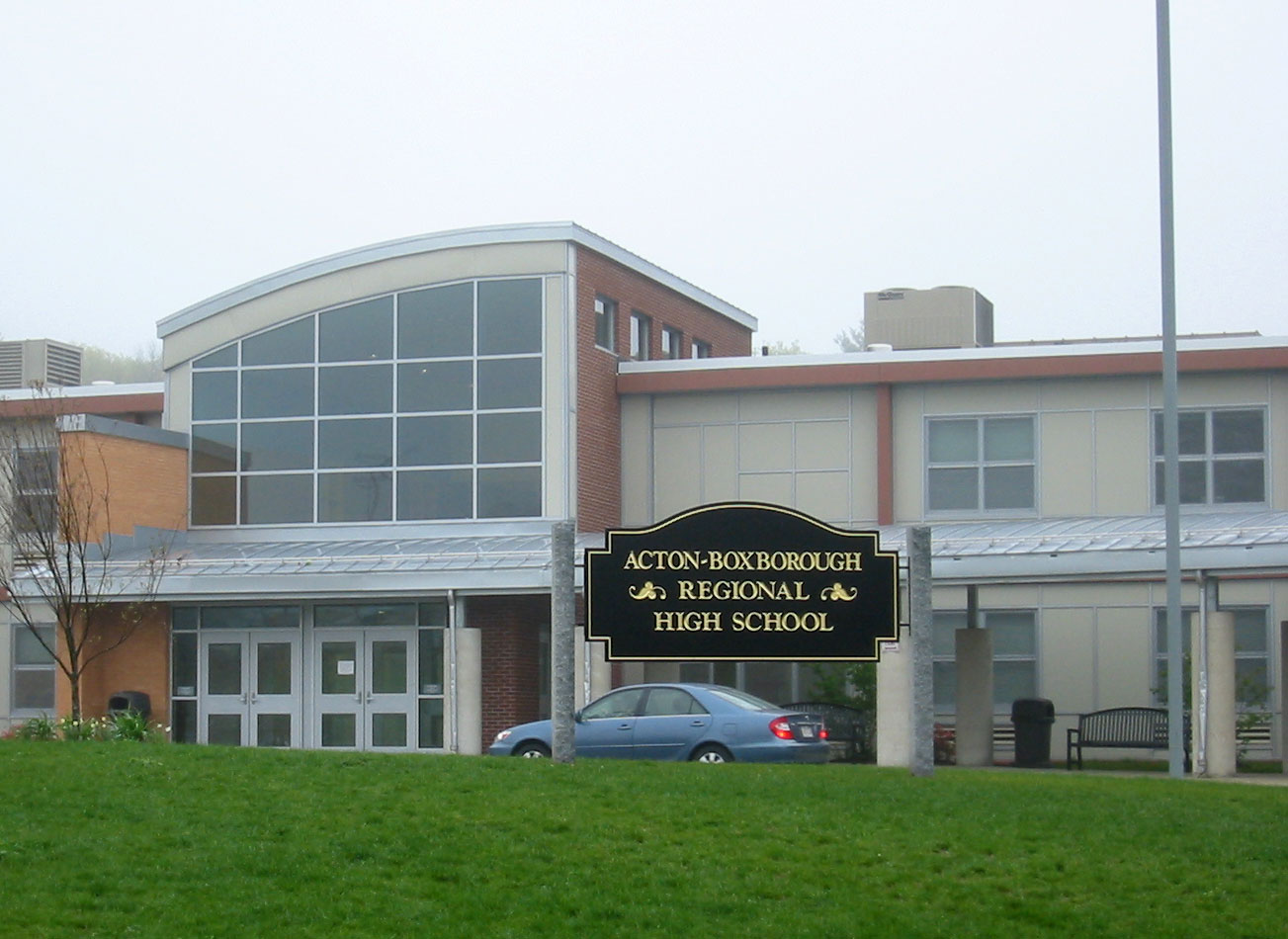
Acton-Boxborough Regional High School

Secondary schools:

- Acton-Boxborough Regional High School (Acton)
- R.J. Grey Junior High School (Acton)

Elementary schools:

- Blanchard Memorial School (Boxborough)
- Boardwalk School (West Acton)
- Parker Damon School (Acton)

Preschool:

- Carol Huebner Early Childhood Program (West Acton)

== 2026 Elementary Reorganization ==
Until the 2025-2026 school year, the district had six elementary schools: Blanchard Memorial in Boxborough, C.T. Douglas and Paul P. Gates at the Boardwalk campus in West Acton, Merriam and McCarthy-Towne in the Parker-Damon building in Acton, and Luther Conant in East Acton. Each school had its own distinctive identity and approach to pedagogy, and a "school choice" program asked families entering the district to rank their preferred schools.

Due to declining student population and increasing costs to maintain or upgrade the 1971 building housing the Luther Conant elementary school, the District conducted studies during 2025, ultimately leading to a reorganization of its elementary schools in Acton after the 2025-2026 school year as part of an "AB Forward" 2026-2031 strategic plan.

The Conant school closed at the end of the school year, while the Douglas and Gates schools were combined into the Boardwalk School, and Merriam and McCarthy-Towne were combined into the Parker-Damon School. Instead of the Boardwalk and Parker-Damon buildings each containing two K-6 schools as before, starting in the 2026-2027 school year they will each contain a Lower School (grades K-3) and an Upper School (grades 4-6).

The School Choice program was replaced with geographic zones. Generally, students from Boxborough will now attend Blanchard School, while students from West Acton and North Acton will attend Boardwalk School, and students from East Acton and South Acton will attend Parker-Damon School.
