= Littleton mill =

Building in Littleton, Massachusetts, USA

Coordinates: 42.5468°N 71.47449°W

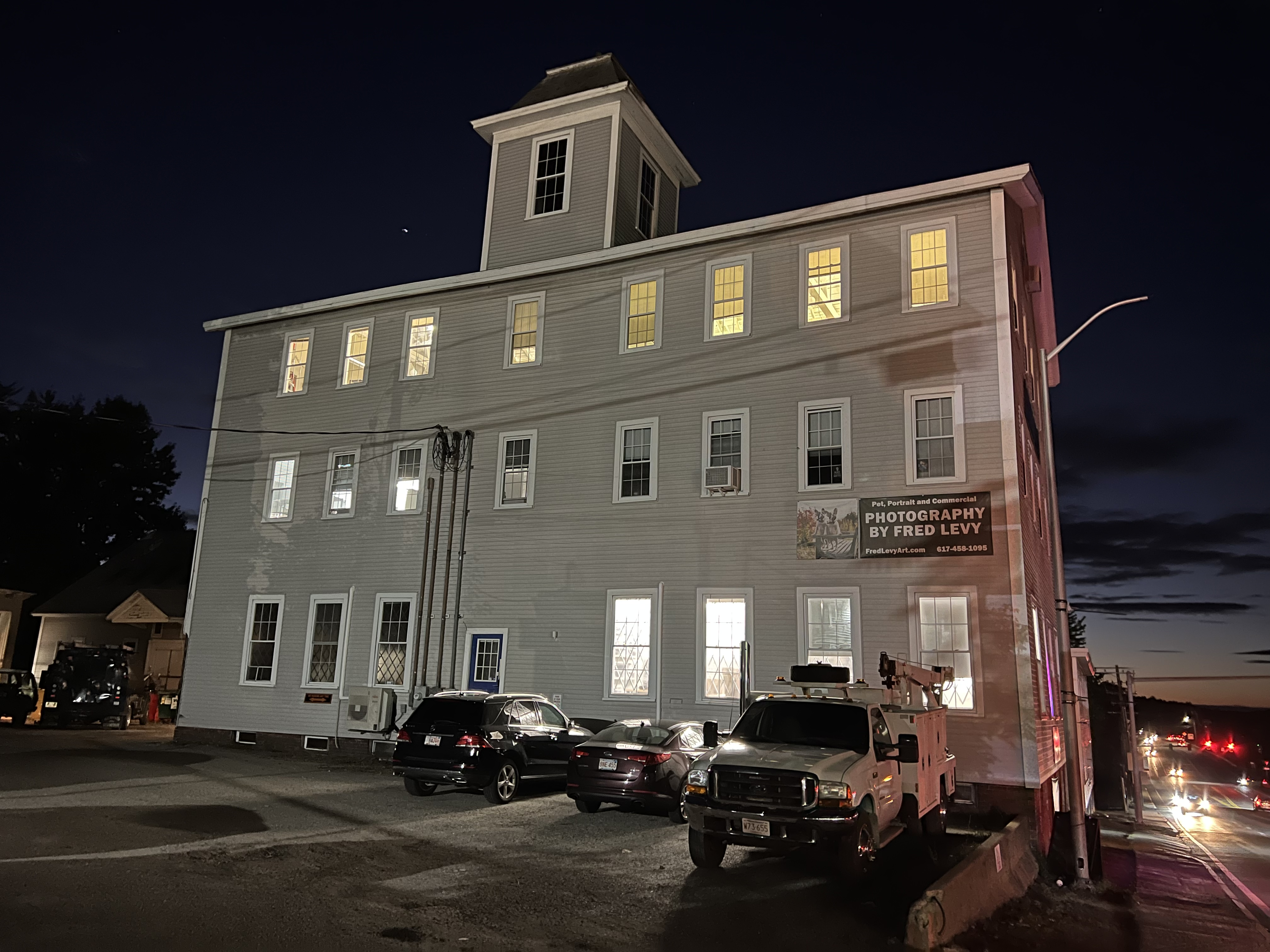
The Littleton mill in 2022

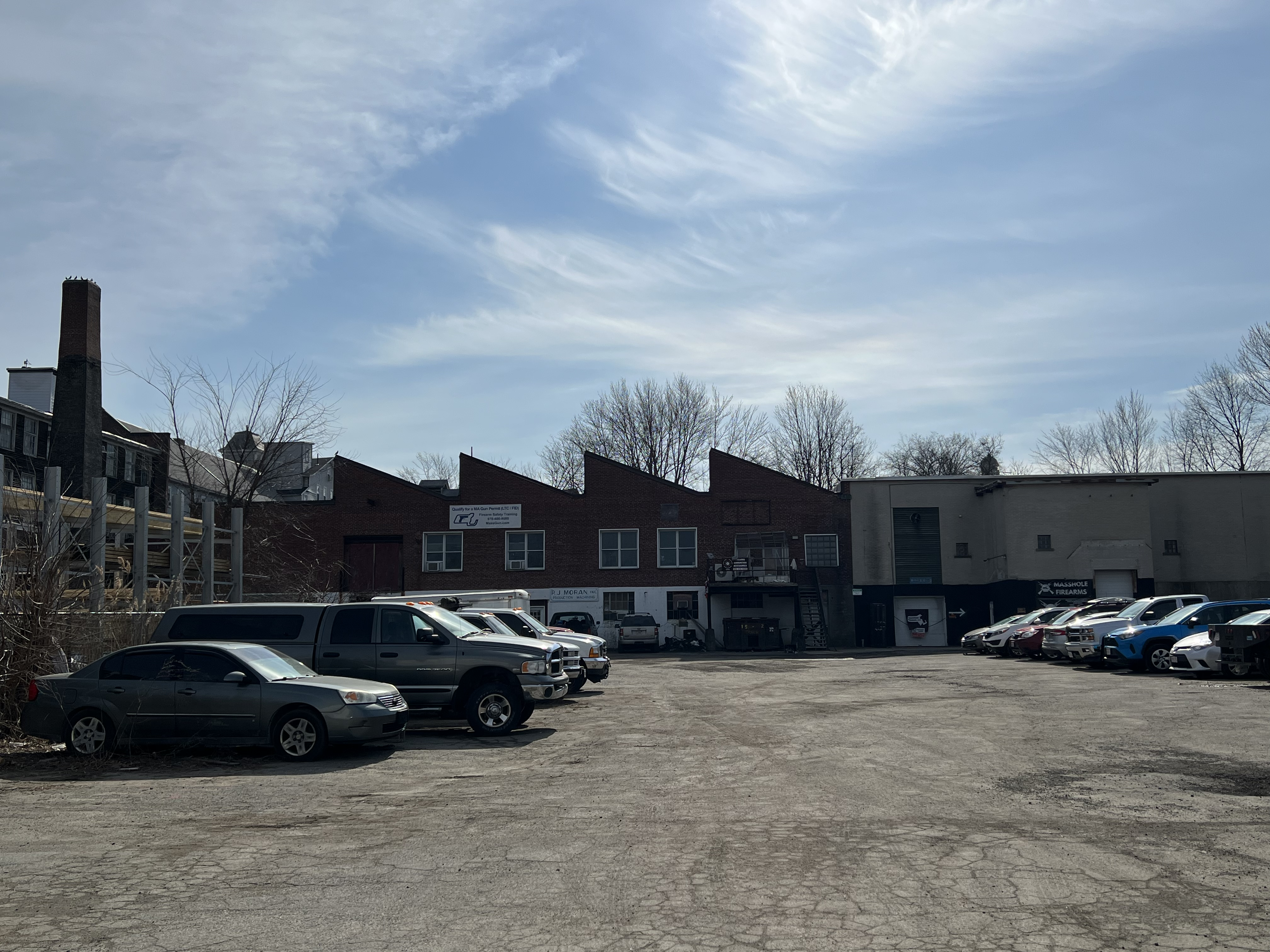
The Littleton mill in 2023

The Littleton mill is a building located at 410 Great Road and 450 King street in Littleton, Massachusetts. It is notable as having the highest concentration of federally-licensed firearms manufacturers (Type 07 FFLs) (between seventy-five or eighty-three vendors) in one building in the entire United States.

== History ==
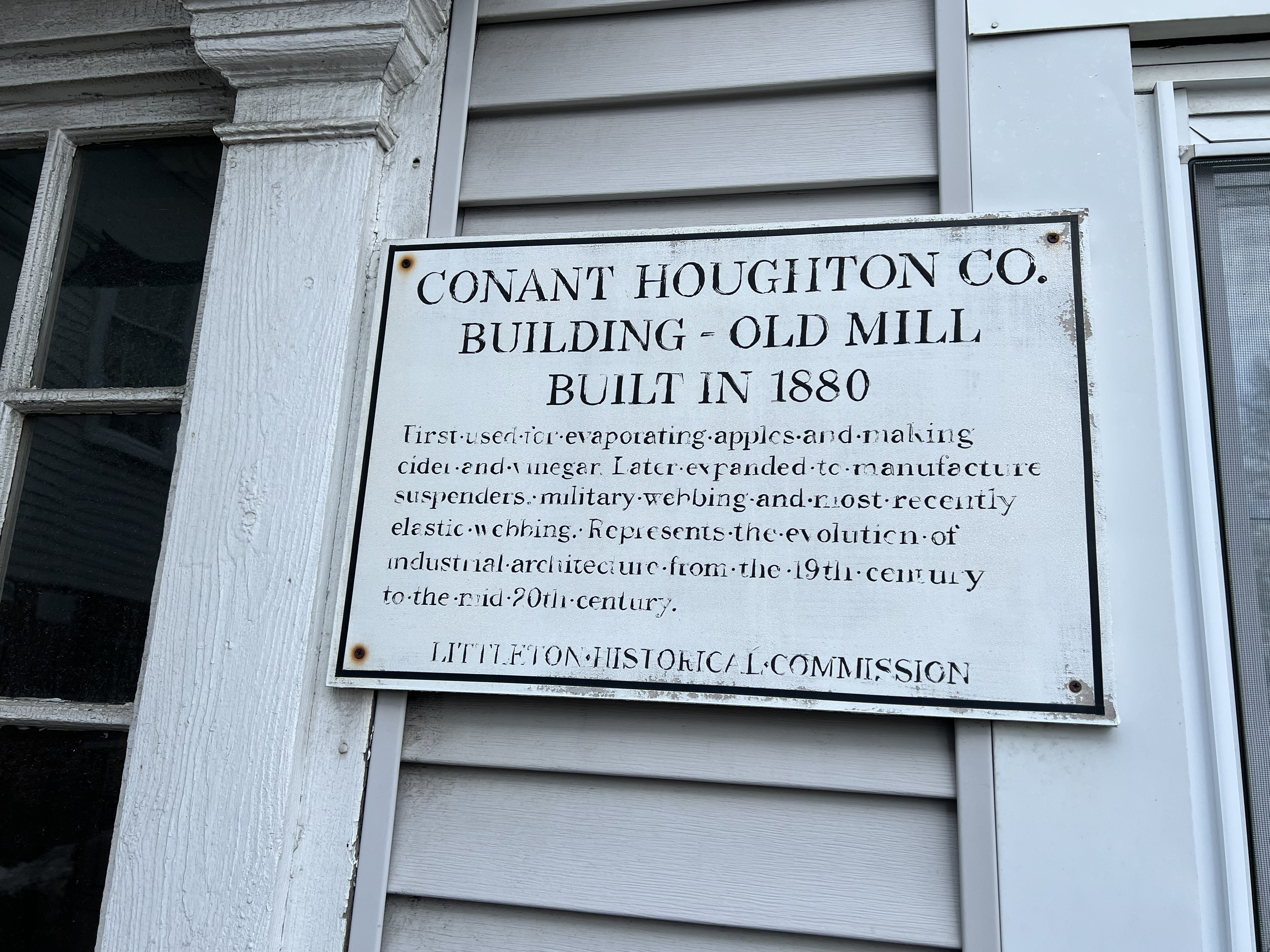
Sign on the building

'An historical sketch of the town of Littleton' published in 1890 references "At the Common Village are located the factory for manufacturing elastic webs and suspenders and the apple evaporator, both owned and operated by Conant & Houghton"

The original building on the site was called the Conant Houghton Co. Building and was built in 1880, and was involved in the processing of apples, and later textiles.

=== Firearms ===
The building currently has 83 firearms dealers as tenants. A Boston Globe article published this fact in late 2022 and as a result, many residents protested, having previously been unaware of the existence of so many retailers in their town. The retailers had not had a police inspection in years. However, since 2020, all dealers/manufacturers at the Mill have been inspected by the Littleton Police Department annually in accordance with state law.

In addition to firearms sales, manufacturing, and gunsmithing, the Littleton Mill is an important center for firearms training including classes for firearms safety, Metallic Cartridge Reloading, basic trauma intervention. and FFL recordkeeping.

In 2023, one dealer in the mill was federally charged after guns he had sold to a straw buyer were used in a shooting.
