= Acton-Boxborough Regional High School =

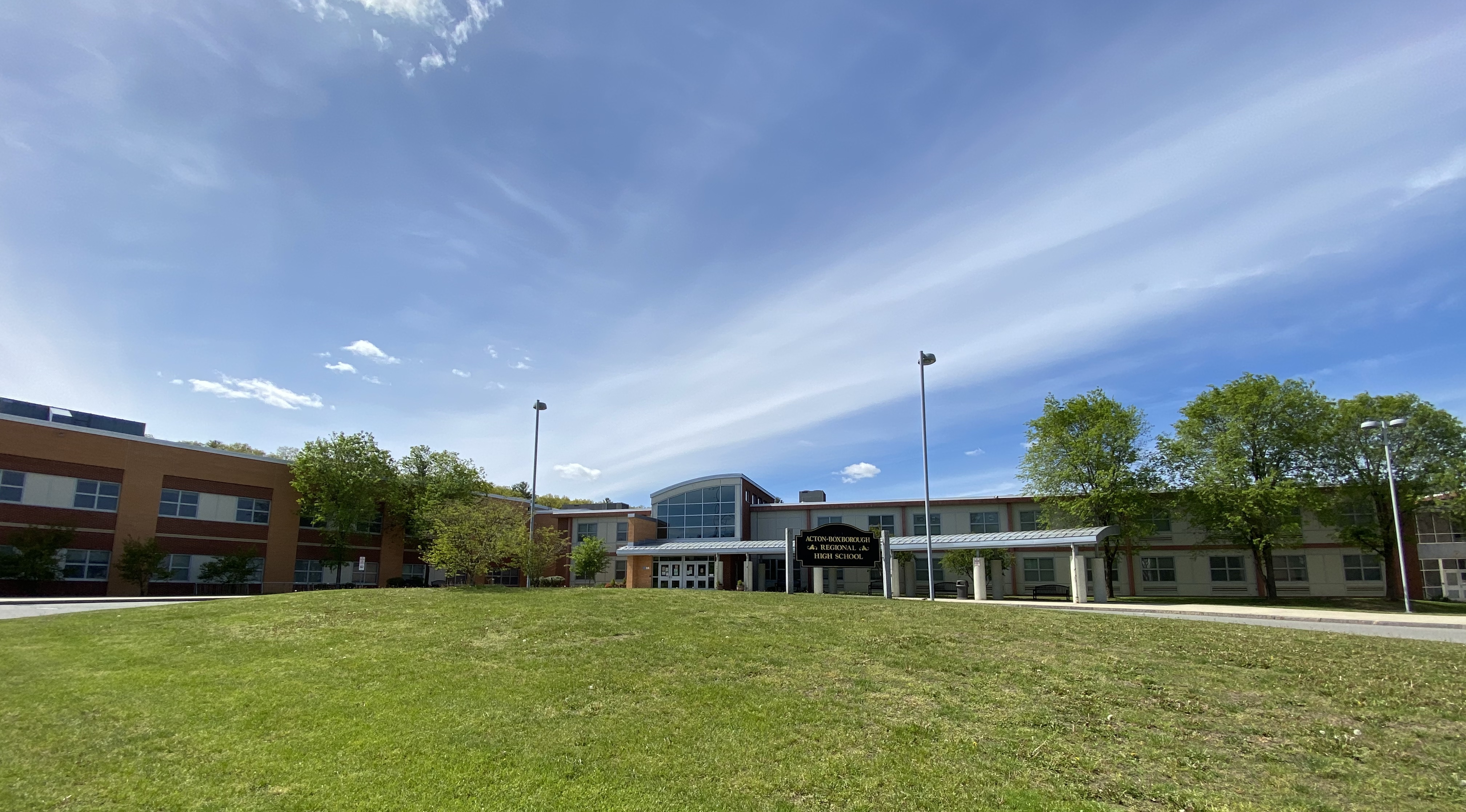

Location
- 36 Charter Road; Acton, Massachusetts 01720; United States
- 42°28′47″N 71°27′26″W

Information
- Type: Public secondary school
- School district: Acton-Boxborough Regional School District
- Principal: Joanie Dean
- Teaching staff: 121.51 (FTE)
- Enrollment: 1,649 (2023–2024)
- Student to teacher ratio: 13.57
- Colors: Blue & Gold
- Athletics: 21 interscholastic sports
- Athletics conference: Dual County League
- Mascot: Acton Boxborough Revolution
- Communities served: Acton, Boxborough
- Website: abrhs.abschools.org

Acton-Boxborough Regional High School (ABRHS or simply AB) is an open-enrollment high school in Acton, Massachusetts, United States. A part of the Acton-Boxborough Regional School District, it serves the Massachusetts towns of Acton and Boxborough and has students in grades 9 through 12. It is situated downhill from the Raymond J. Grey Junior High School, at 36 Charter Road in Acton. Raymond J. Grey Junior High School occupies the facility that, until 1973, was the high school.

In 1999 multiple fires were set at ABRHS. The first fire began near the gymnasium but was quickly extinguished. The second fire, a five-alarm blaze in the school auditorium, seriously damaged the auditorium and forced the evacuation of all 1,300 students and canceled school the following day. No students or staff were injured, but one firefighter was hospitalized after suffering from smoke inhalation. ABRHS underwent a $40 million renovation and expansion in 2005.

== Rankings ==
The Acton-Boxborough Regional School District is highly ranked both regionally and nationally. U.S. News & World Report ranks Acton-Boxborough Regional High School 13th in Massachusetts. Niche.com ranks the district 18th among the best school districts in Massachusetts. Additionally, the district's STEM program is ranked in the top 20 in the nation.

== Mascot ==
In June 2020, a change.org petition was started to change the AB "Colonials" mascot to "challenge the normalization of colonialism in our daily lives." A few months later, after a challenging debate, "the Acton-Boxborough Regional School Committee unanimously voted to retire the Colonial as the school mascot." After nearly two years, a new mascot was chosen from a narrowed down list of submissions resulting in the new mascot, the Acton Boxborough Revolution.

== Notable alumni ==
- Seth Abramson, poet
- Tom Barrasso, Hall of Fame NHL goalie, 2x Stanley Cup Champion, 2002 Winter Olympics Silver medalist
- Bob Brooke, NHL player
- Jamie Eldridge, MA Senator
- Steve Hathaway, MLB pitcher
- Drew Houston, founder of Dropbox
- Maria Konnikova, writer, professional poker player, and journalist
- Shin Lim, magician, America's Got Talent Season 13 and America's Got Talent: The Champions winner
- Bill Morrissey, Grammy-nominated American folk singer-songwriter
- Jeff Norton, NHL hockey player
- Matt Shearer, reporter for WBZ
- Caroll Spinney, Sesame Street puppeteer who performed Big Bird
- Evelyn Stevens, cyclist
- Bob Sweeney, retired NHL player, President of Boston Bruins Foundation
- Jessamyn West, librarian
- Taylor Jenkins Reid, author
