= John Hanson Mitchell =

American author (born 1940)

John Hanson Mitchell (born 1940) is an American author best known for a series of books that concentrate on a single square mile of land in eastern Massachusetts known as Scratch Flat.

== Early life and education ==
Mitchell was born in 1940 in Englewood, New Jersey, the son of James A. Mitchell (1896 – 1967), an early civil rights activist. He left home as a teenager and studied in Europe at the Sorbonne and the University of Madrid before returning to the States. He graduated from Columbia University in 1967 with a degree in comparative literature.

== Career ==
Following graduation he worked in the field of environmental education and then began freelance writing. In 1973 Mitchell was hired by the Massachusetts Audubon Society and in 1980 founded and edited the Society's award-winning journal Sanctuary. Mitchell's first book, Ceremonial Time: Fifteen Thousand Years on One Square Mile, was published in 1984 and went on to become something of a cult classic, thanks partly to his inclusion of Native American history in the narrative. This was followed by a series of books collected together as The Scratch Flat Chronicles. The books focus on Mitchell's continuing fascination with the idea of place and time and the interrelationship between human culture and nature.

Other books deal with travel and gardens, and a memoir, The Rose Café, the story of Mitchell's sojourn working in Corsica as a young man during the Algerian War. In 2005, he published Looking for Mr. Gilbert, his account of his discovery of the glass plate negatives and life of Robert A. Gilbert, the first African American landscape photographer.

Mitchell received a number of awards for the body of his work, including travel grants, and an honorary doctorate from Fitchburg State University. In 2000 he won the New England Independent Bookseller's Award for the body of his work, and was also recognized for his earlier work in book design and his Sanctuary essays. In 1993 he received the Outstanding Natural History Essay award from the John Burroughs Association for his essay "Of Time and the River."

Ceremonial Time was Editor's Choice at the NYT'S Book Review; most of his other works were favorably reviewed in the Times, the Boston Globe, Washington Post, L.A. Times, London Times Literary Supplement, etc. Six books based on the square mile of land featured in Ceremonial Time have been republished by the University of New England Press, collected together as The Scratch Flat Chronicles. Stray Leaves, a collection of his Sanctuary essays, was published in 2015.

== Bibliography ==
- Ceremonial Time: Fifteen Thousand Years on One Square Mile
- A Field Guide to Your Own Backyard: A Seasonal Guide to the Flora and Fauna of the Eastern U.S.
- Living at the End of Time
- Walking Towards Walden: A Pilgrimage in Search of Place
- The Wildest Place on Earth: Italian Gardens and the Invention of Wilderness
- Trespassing: An Inquiry into the Private Ownership of Land
- Looking for Mr. Gilbert: The Reimagined Life of an African American
- Following the Sun: A Bicycle Pilgrimage from Andalusia to the Hebrides
- The Rose Café: Love and War in Corsica
- The Paradise of All These Parts: A Natural History of Boston
- The Last of the Bird People (novel)
- An Eden of Sorts: The Natural History of My Feral Garden
- Stray Leaves
