= Jeanne Munn Bracken =

American author and a retired librarian

- Education: University of New Hampshire; Simmons College
- Occupations: Writer and Librarian
- Writing career
- Language: English
- Website: jeannemunnbracken.com

Jeanne Munn Bracken is an American author and a retired librarian. She is known for her non-fiction work, including Children With Cancer: A Comprehensive Reference Guide for Parents.

== Biography ==
Bracken graduated from the University of New Hampshire in 1968 with a major in German Language and Literature and a minor in Speech and Drama. She earned her masters in Library Science from Simmons College in 1971. Bracken went on to work at the UNH Dimond Library, at the Boston University School of Medicine Library, at the Research Library at Arthur D. Little, Inc., at the Acton Memorial Library, and at the Lincoln Public Library. In addition to being a librarian, for over 22 years from the '80s through the 2000s. she wrote a weekly life-style column for the Littleton (MA) Independent and its sister newspapers which she were the core of Someday We’ll Laugh About This. Bracken retired as a librarian in 2006.

Bracken's daughter, Lisa, was diagnosed and successfully treated for cancer when she was a child. During this time, Bracken researched cancer which led to her writing her first book.

== Writing ==
Bracken's guide, Children With Cancer: A Comprehensive Reference Guide for Parents (2010) was called "Highly recommended" by Library Journal in 2010. The Journal of the Medical Library Association wrote that the format of the book "works very well" and that the references in the book are excellent. The Journal wrote that it is "an essential part of the collection of pediatric hospital libraries."

Library Journal also reviewed the 1986 edition and said Bracken gave "Good, clear overall coverage" of the topic. The Los Angeles Times wrote "Her perceptive suggestions help the reader calm the small child who is afraid of yet another need, aid the angry adolescent with a puffy face and bald head, give the exhausted parent permission to take the night off."

== Bibliography ==
- Life in the American Colonies: Daily Lifestyles of the Early Settlers. Carlisle, Massachusetts: Discovery Enterprises. 1995. ISBN 9780613188906.
- Iron Horses Across America: The Transcontinental Railroad. Carlisle, Massachusetts: Discovery Enterprises. 1995. ISBN 9781878668363.
- Life in the Southern Colonies: Jamestown, Williamsburg, St. Mary's City and Beyond. Carlisle, Massachusetts: Discovery Enterprises. 1997. ISBN 9780613188920.
- American Waterways: Canal Days. Carlisle, Massachusetts: Discovery Enterprises. 1997. ISBN 9781878668752.
- The Orphan Trains. with JoAnne Weisman Deitch. Carlisle, Massachusetts: Discovery Enterprises. 2002. ISBN 9781579600846.
- Someday We'll Laugh About This. Littleton, Massachusetts: Molisa Press. 2005. ISBN 9780976212508.
- Women in the American Revolution. Boston: History Compass. 2009. ISBN 9781932663235.
- Children With Cancer: A Comprehensive Reference Guide for Parents (Revised and updated ed.). New York: Oxford University Press. 2010. ISBN 9780195147391.

== Awards ==
- Best Editorial, Massachusetts Press Association
- Best Feature article (2d and 3d prizes: New England Press Association)
- Best column (2d and 3d prizes: New England Press Association)
- Best column (1st prize): National Press Association
- Excellence in Cancer Communications (American Cancer Society, Massachusetts Division)
- New York Times Librarian Award, 2005
