= Boxborough, Massachusetts =

- Town
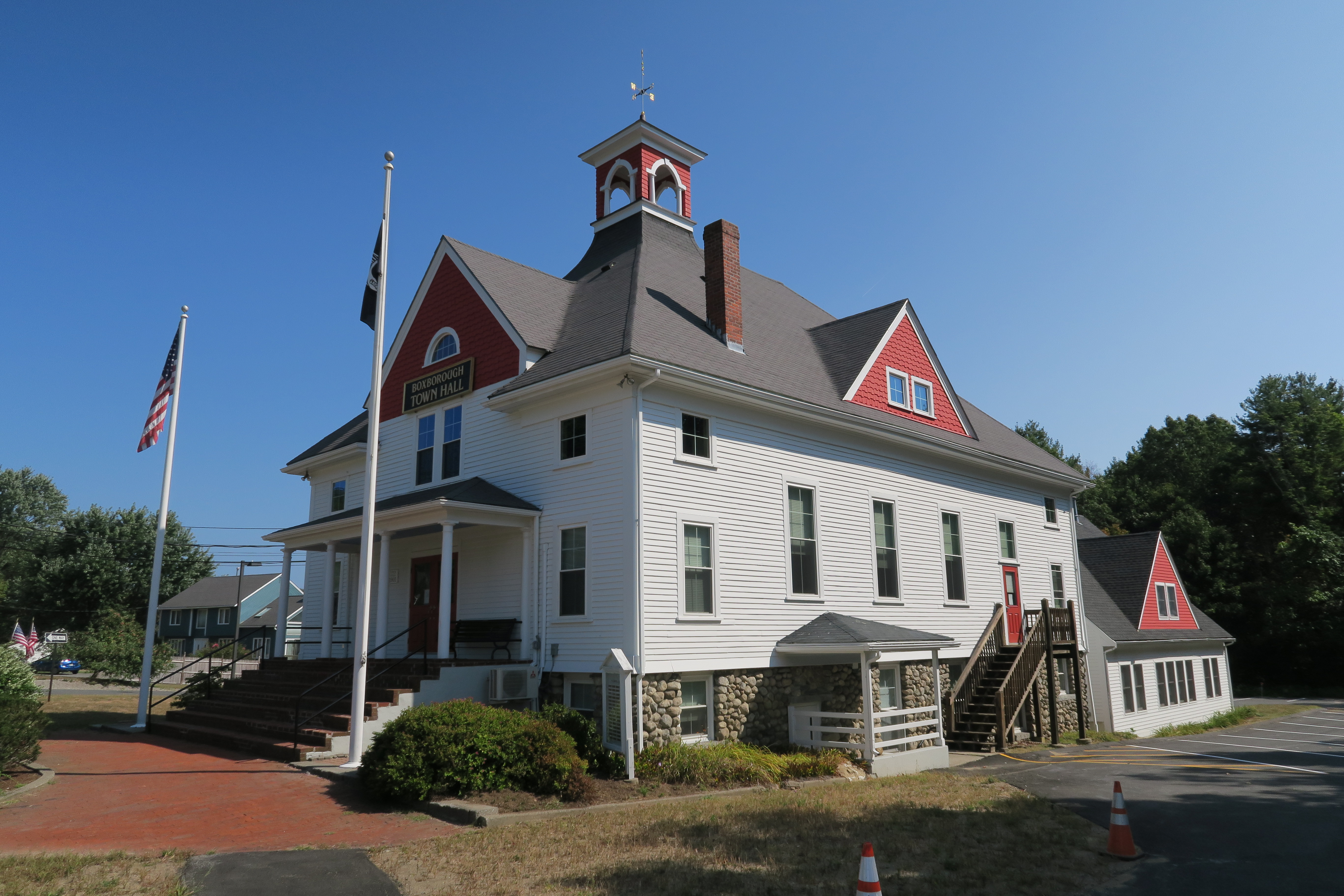
- Boxborough Town Hall

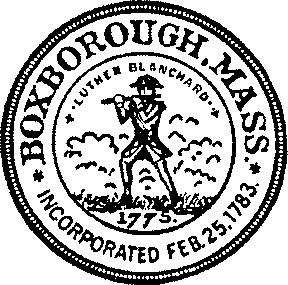
- Seal

- Location in Middlesex County in Massachusetts
- Coordinates: 42°29′00″N 71°31′00″W
- Country: United States
- State: Massachusetts
- County: Middlesex
- Settled: 1680
- Incorporated: February 25, 1783

Government
  - Type: Open town meeting
  - Town Administrator: Michael Johns

Area
  - Total: 10.4 sq mi (27.0 km^{2})
  - Land: 10.3 sq mi (26.8 km^{2})
  - Water: 0.039 sq mi (0.1 km^{2})
- Elevation: 335 ft (102 m)

Population (2020)
  - Total: 5,506
  - Density: 532/sq mi (205/km^{2})
- Time zone: UTC−5 (Eastern)
  - Summer (DST): UTC−4 (Eastern)
- ZIP Code: 01719
- Area code: 351/978
- FIPS code: 25-07350
- GNIS feature ID: 0618218
- Website: boxborough-ma.gov

Boxborough is a town in Middlesex County, Massachusetts, United States. The population was 5,506 at the 2020 census. The town name is often simplified to "Boxboro" on highway signs and official documents.

== Geography ==
According to the United States Census Bureau, the town has a total area of 10.4 square miles (27 km^{2}), of which 10.4 square miles (27 km^{2}) is land and 0.1 square miles (0.26 km^{2}), or 0.48%, is water.

Boxborough is bordered by Littleton to the north, Acton to the east, Stow to the south, and Harvard to the west. Prior to incorporation in 1783, the area that is now Boxborough was part of Stow, Harvard, and Littleton.

== Demographics ==
Historical population
Year	Pop.	±%
1790	412	—
1850	395	−4.1%
1860	403	+2.0%
1870	338	−16.1%
1880	319	−5.6%
1890	325	+1.9%
1900	316	−2.8%
1910	317	+0.3%
1920	298	−6.0%
1930	312	+4.7%
1940	376	+20.5%
1950	439	+16.8%
1960	744	+69.5%
1970	1,451	+95.0%
1980	3,126	+115.4%
1990	3,343	+6.9%
2000	4,868	+45.6%
2010	4,996	+2.6%
2020	5,506	+10.2%
2022*	5,412	−1.7%
* = population estimate. Source: United States census records and Population Estimates Program data.

As of the census of 2000, there were 4,868 people, 1,853 households, and 1,271 families residing in the town. The population density was 469.7 inhabitants per square mile (181.4/km^{2}). There were 1,906 housing units at an average density of 183.9 per square mile (71.0/km^{2}). The racial makeup of the town was 88.82% White, 0.33% African American, 0.02% Native American, 8.48% Asian, 0.37% from other races, and 1.97% from two or more races. Hispanic or Latino of any race were 1.13% of the population.

There were 1,853 households, out of which 42.8% had children under the age of 18 living with them, 60.2% were married couples living together, 5.9% had a female householder with no husband present, and 31.4% were non-families. Of all households, 25.9% were made up of individuals, and 3.2% had someone living alone who was 65 years of age or older. The average household size was 2.63 and the average family size was 3.25.

In the town, the population was spread out, with 30.5% under the age of 18, 5.1% from 18 to 24, 34.3% from 25 to 44, 25.3% from 45 to 64, and 4.7% who were 65 years of age or older. The median age was 37 years. For every 100 females, there were 104.1 males. For every 100 females age 18 and over, there were 102.0 males.

According to the 2010 Census, the median income for a household in the town was $115,639 and the average income for a household was $147,625. The per capita income for the town was $59,551. About 1.5% of families and 2.8% of the population were below the poverty line, including 3.8% of those under age 18 and none of those age 65 or over.

== Education ==
Boxborough is part of the Acton Boxborough Regional School District (ABRSD) along with Acton. The town has one elementary school serving K–6, the Blanchard Memorial School. Middle school students then attend the R.J. Grey Junior High School from grades 7–8. High school students then attend Acton-Boxborough Regional High School from grades 9–12.

Acton-Boxborough Regional High School (ABRHS) is highly ranked within Massachusetts and nationwide. The U.S. Department of Education designated the institution as a Blue Ribbon School in 2009. In 2008, Newsweek magazine ranked ABRHS as one of the best high schools in the country. In 2019, ABRHS was again ranked by Newsweek as one of the top five hundred STEM schools in the country. The school has also ranked in the top ten for the National Academic Decathlon.

== History ==
=== Early history ===
The area which became the town of Boxborough was first inhabited by the Native Americans of the Nipmuc and Pennacook tribes. It was probably visited by colonists as early as the mid seventeenth century, before the neighboring towns of Stow (1683) and Acton (1735) were founded. However, the land in Boxborough was not settled until the beginning of the eighteenth century by farmers looking for fertile land to establish farms. Over the next decades, this area would become one of the most productive agricultural farming areas in the county. Several men from the area served in the Seven Years' War.

=== Revolutionary War ===
On April 19, 1775, 21 men from Boxborough met at the Boaz Brown house on Hill road before marching with the companies of Littleton and Acton to the Battles of Lexington and Concord. Most of these men, previously farmers, would go on to serve the colonial militia for the remainder of the war.

Sons of Simon Blanchard, descendant of some of the earliest settlers of Boxborough (and killed during the Battle of the Plains of Abraham in 1759 during the Seven Years' War), Calvin and Luther Blanchard, are two prominent revolutionary veterans. Luther marched with Captain Isaac Davis's company of Acton to the Battle of Concord, serving as a fifer. At the North Bridge, several minute-men companies engaged with the British troops in a conflict remembered as the shot heard round the world, eventually forcing the redcoats to retreat. Blanchard is remembered by some historians as the first man wounded, but it is hard to confirm considering the nature of the battle. He received a musket-shot to the chest. Historian Lucie Hager documents Luther's witty interaction with a Concord woman who was tending his wound:

Nurse: "A little more and you've been killed."
Luther: Yes, and a little more and it would not have touched me."

Luther died three days later, ostensibly of the wounds he received in these battles. He is buried at the Old Burial Ground in Littleton, Massachusetts. A picture of Luther is featured on the Boxborough seal. Calvin survived the war and went on to be involved in early Boxborough politics. It is after descendants of this same Blanchard family that Blanchard Memorial School was named.

=== Founding ===
A closer church served as the motivation for establishing a new district; those who lived in the extreme parts of this area found it difficult to travel all the way to church every week (the community had been built on Puritan ideals, attending church was required at this time). Perhaps the key players in this movement, fresh from fighting in the Revolutionary War, were pursuing further independence.

Boxborough was formed from Harvard, Littleton, and Stow. A member of Middlesex County, Boxborough established a new county line between Middlesex and Worcester. On January 31, 1775, men of this area formed a "Sartain Society" which agreed to purchase the Harvard Old meeting-house to act as a town hall and a church.

The people of Boxborough were denied registration to be an independent district three times before being accepted in 1782, then incorporated on February 25, 1783. At first, Boxborough didn't send a representative to the General Court, instead continuing to help elect a representative from Stow.

Besides the Blanchard family, several other early settlers of Boxborough were instrumental in its establishment as an independent district. John Wetherbee and his family built houses in what would become Boxborough as early as 1717, and some historians consider John the first settler of the area. Silas Wetherbee, born a generation later, fought for a Stow company during the Revolution, and gave the land on which the new meeting-house and church was built after the war. Silas was not just a veteran and financial backer, but was also elected as an original selectman. The Wetherbee Family continues to influence Boxborough politics for a century to come.

The Taylor brothers were also some of the first settlers in the area. Silas Taylor served as a captain in the Revolutionary War before serving as the first clerk of the district of Boxborough, as well as an original selectman and assessor. Phinehas Taylor Jr. also served as a captain in the War, going on to serve as the original treasurer and deer-reeve of the district.

Other old Boxborough families include the Hager Family, the Wood Family, and the Stone family, each of which settled in the area before its incorporation and had men serve during the Revolutionary War. Bennet Wood and Joseph Stone served as the first official Boxborough government, serving as the committee for the Sartain Society, along with moderator Henry Cooledge. Joseph Stone, originally from Harvard, was deeply involved in the area, serving as justice of the peace and a deacon of the congregational church until his death. The Wood Family was also influential in the early politics of Littleton; Bennet's father, Jeremiah, served as collector, selectman, and eventually treasurer.

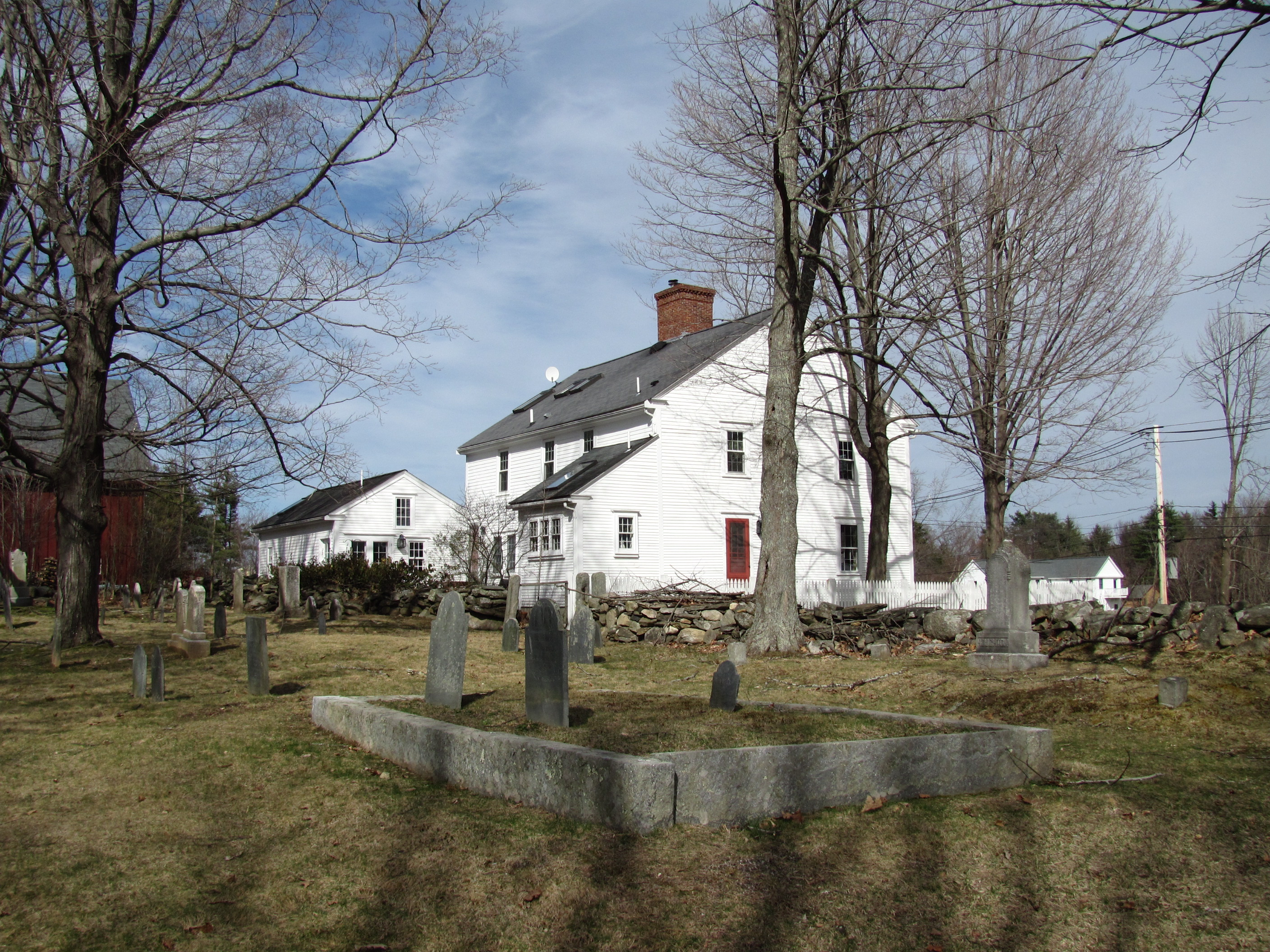
Old North Cemetery

Most of these influential Boxborians were buried in the Old North Cemetery, which has graves dating back to the eighteenth century.

== Attractions ==
On October 16, 2005, the Boxborough Historical Society opened the Boxborough Museum. The museum is located at 575 Middle Road and is open several Sundays a year. Boxborough is also known for Steele Farm, a popular location for sledding and hikes, with dog-friendly conservation trails.

There is a good example of a glacial esker, over one mile in length, located in the Beaver Valley Preserve.

An annual Harvest Fair is held in September, celebrating Boxborough's agricultural legacy.

Boxborough is home to several historical landmarks and sites on the Freedom Trail. The Silas Taylor Farm can be found on Flagg Hill. The Silas Wethebee House (est. 1770), or Walnut Farm, can be seen today on Hill Road as part of the "Path of the Patriots."

=== Conservation areas and playing fields ===
Boxborough has fourteen distinct state, non-profit, conservation or municipal tracts of lands with trails suitable for a number of non-motorized activities. These are maintained by town volunteers and the town employees (mostly where mowing is required).

Flerra Meadows provides soccer fields, as well as a small playground and pond. Liberty Fields has a baseball diamond, multiple soccer fields and a conservation trail in the woods.

The Boxborough Mamils, a cycling group, meets regularly at Flerra Meadows for community bike rides in Boxborough and neighboring towns.

== Reenactments and commemorations ==
=== Boxborough Minutemen Company ===
The Boxborough Minutemen Company is a historical society founded in Boxborough in 1967 with the goal of preserving the memory of the town's role in the American Revolution, as well as serving the community. The Minutemen sponsor local activities and businesses, give out scholarships, and participate in historical reenactments.

The legacy of the revolution has lived on through several groups similar to the Minutemen Company dating back to the end of the eighteenth century. Following the Revolutionary War, the "Slam Bang Company" was founded by patriotic men of Boxborough, eventually dissolving into the "Boxborough Light Infantry Company." The goals of these groups seem purely honorary, though it is recorded that they met three times a year for annual military training through the nineteenth century.

=== Fifer's Day ===
Boxborough is known for its annual Fifer's Day celebration, put on by the Minutemen, which commemorates Luther Blanchard. Fifer's Day is held every June at Flerra Meadows in Boxborough. It begins with a 4-mile (6.4 km) road race, followed by a parade and many different festivities. Booths with hamburgers, hot dogs, snow cones etc. line the field and games, bands and volleyball tournaments complete the afternoon. Other Fifer's Day activities typically include pony rides, air balloon rides, and fire engine demonstrations.

== Notable people ==
- Allen Bourbeau, Harvard University, played with Team USA at the 1988 Winter Olympics
- Callahan Burke, professional ice hockey player for the Colorado Avalanche
- Ted Crowley, NHL professional hockey player; grew up on Guggins Lane
- Lucie Caroline Hager (1853–1903), author
- Adil Najam, member of the United Nations' Intergovernmental Panel on Climate Change (IPCC) which was awarded the 2007 Nobel Prize for Peace
- Bill Rodgers, runner, winner of the Boston Marathon and New York City Marathon
- Isadore Singer, mathematician, recipient of the Abel Prize
- Bob Sweeney, NHL professional hockey player and brother-in-law of Madeline Amy Sweeney
- Fred Wesley Wentworth (1864–1943), architect known for his many buildings in Downtown Paterson, New Jersey
- Jessamyn West, librarian, grew up in Boxborough
