= Alexa St. Martin =

American soccer player

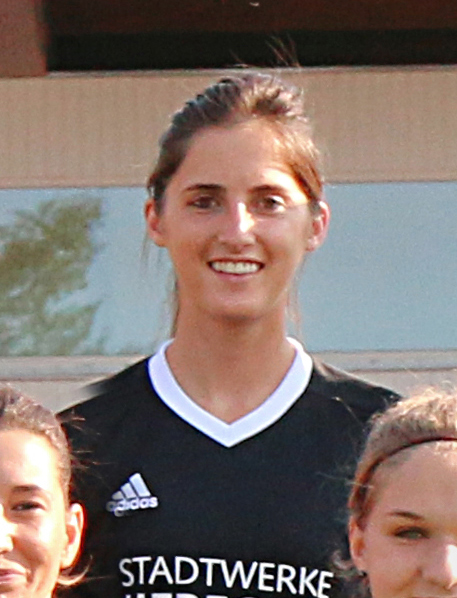
- Herforder SV Borussia 2014

Personal information
- Full name: Alexa Christine St. Martin
- Date of birth: May 27, 1992 (age 34)
- Place of birth: Westford, Massachusetts
- Height: 5 ft 4 in (1.63 m)
- Position: Defender

College career
Years	Team	Apps	(Gls)
2010–2013	Georgetown Hoyas	83	(5)

Senior career*
Years	Team	Apps	(Gls)
2014	Herforder SV	0	(0)
2015	SC Sand	0	(0)
- * Club domestic league appearances and goals

Alexa Christine St. Martin (born May 27, 1992) is an American soccer player who played for SC Sand.

== Early life and education ==
St. Martin was born in Westford, Massachusetts on May 27, 1992 in to Bill and Christine St. Martin. She has two brothers.

At age 13, she participated in a summer camp run by the United States Youth Soccer Association.

St. Martin graduated from Westford Academy, then received a bachelor's degree from Georgetown University, where she majored in English and minored in journalism.

== Soccer career ==
=== College ===
St. Martin was recruited to play as a midfielder at Georgetown University. She held the position for her freshman and junior seasons, then switched to center back in her junior year.

In 2011, she was named a BIG EAST Academic All-Star, and in 2012, she was twice selected as the BIG EAST Defensive Player of the Week.

=== Professional ===
St. Martin trained to play for the Washington Spirit, though she didn't receive a contract offer. In 2014, she joined the Herforder SV Borussia Friedenstal in Herford, Germany. The following year, she signed with SC Sand in Willstätt, Germany.
