= Sarah Dix Hamlin =

American founder of California School

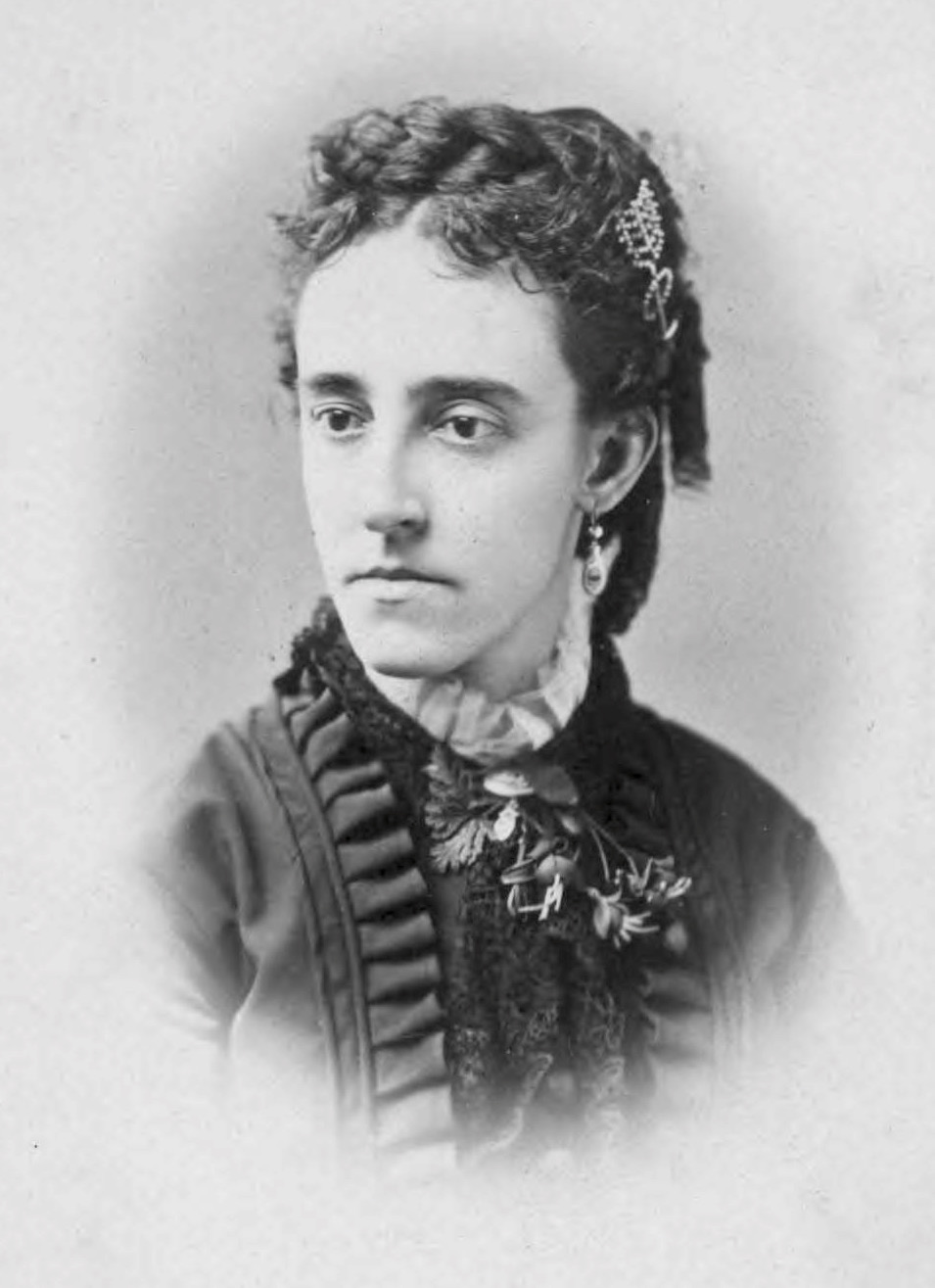
- University of Michigan student portrait, c. 1874
- Born: November 27, 1844; Westford, Massachusetts, US
- Died: August 25, 1923 (aged 78); San Francisco, California, US
- Education: University of Michigan
- Occupations: educator, principal, founder of Hamlin School

Sarah Dix Hamlin (November 27, 1844 – August 25, 1923) was a 19th-century American educator, principal, founder and owner of the Hamlin School for girls in San Francisco.

== Early life ==
Sarah Dix Hamlin was born in Westford, Massachusetts on November 27, 1844.

Hamlin was accepted to University of Michigan. She was one of the first female students accepted to Michigan. She graduated in 1873. She taught school at Cherry Creek, Nevada from 1877 to 1879. In 1891, Hamlin was sent to India, by the Ramabai Association of America, to help establish a school for child widows. She then returned to San Francisco.

== Career ==
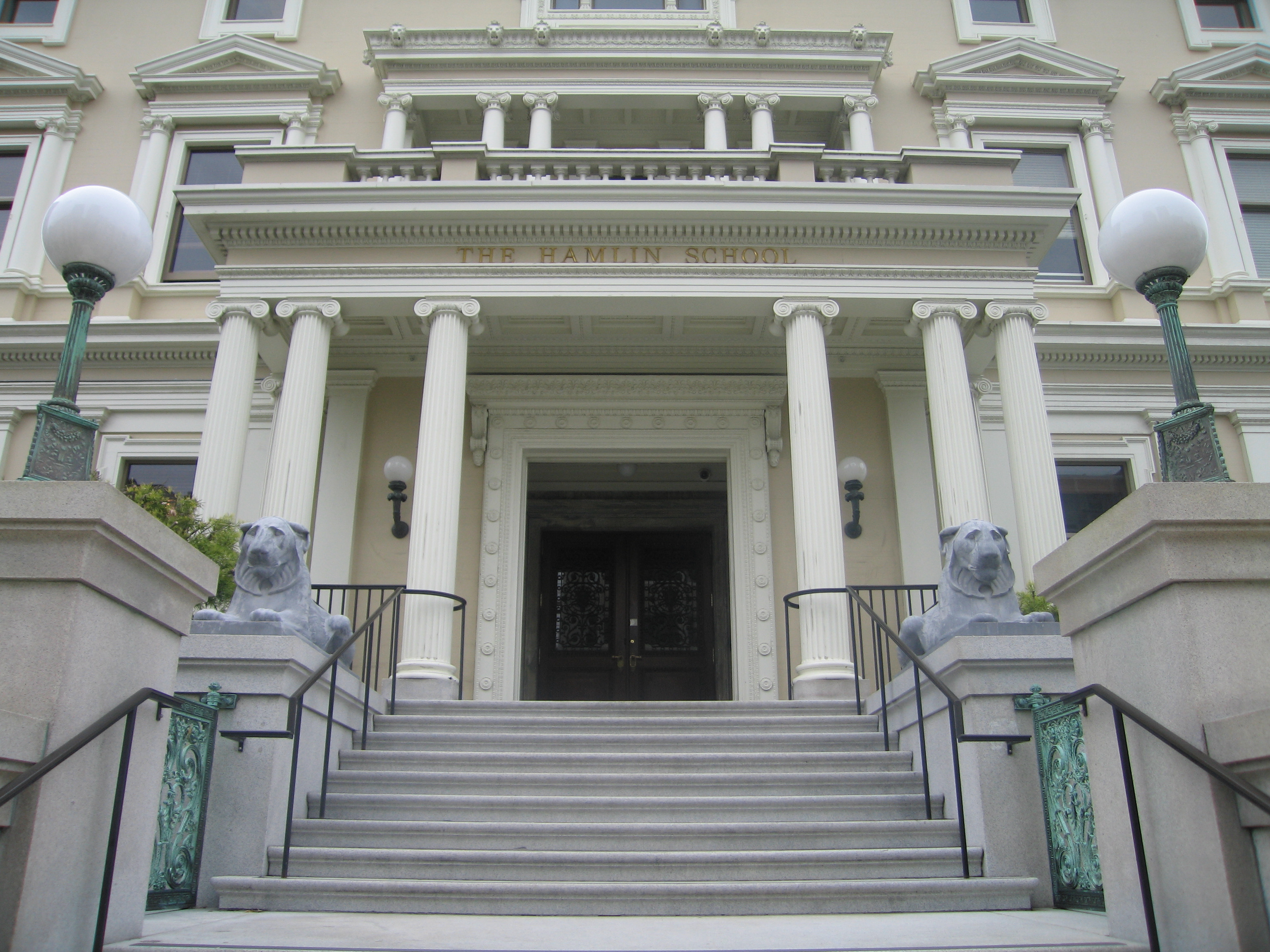
The Hamlin School in San Francisco.

In 1891, Hamlin founded the San Francisco branch of the American Association of University Women, the second oldest in the country. In 1893, Hamlin tutored Alice B. Toklas, a member of the Parisian Avant-garde and the life partner of American writer Gertrude Stein. She was one of four women members of the San Francisco chamber of commerce.

In April 1896 Hamlin purchased the Van Ness Seminary School located at 1849 Jackson Street, San Francisco. The school was renamed Miss Hamlin's School for Girls in 1898.

After the San Francisco earthquake in 1906, Hamlin moved the school to a mansion located at 2230 Pacific Avenue in San Francisco.

== Death ==
On August 25, 1923, the Hamlin school founder, Sarah Dix Hamlin died in San Francisco after a short illness. She was a member of the Grace Cathedral where funeral services were held on August 28. She was cremated and buried at Fairview Cemetery in Westford, Massachusetts.
