= Westford Academy =

Coordinates: 42°34′37.3″N 71°27′49.6″W

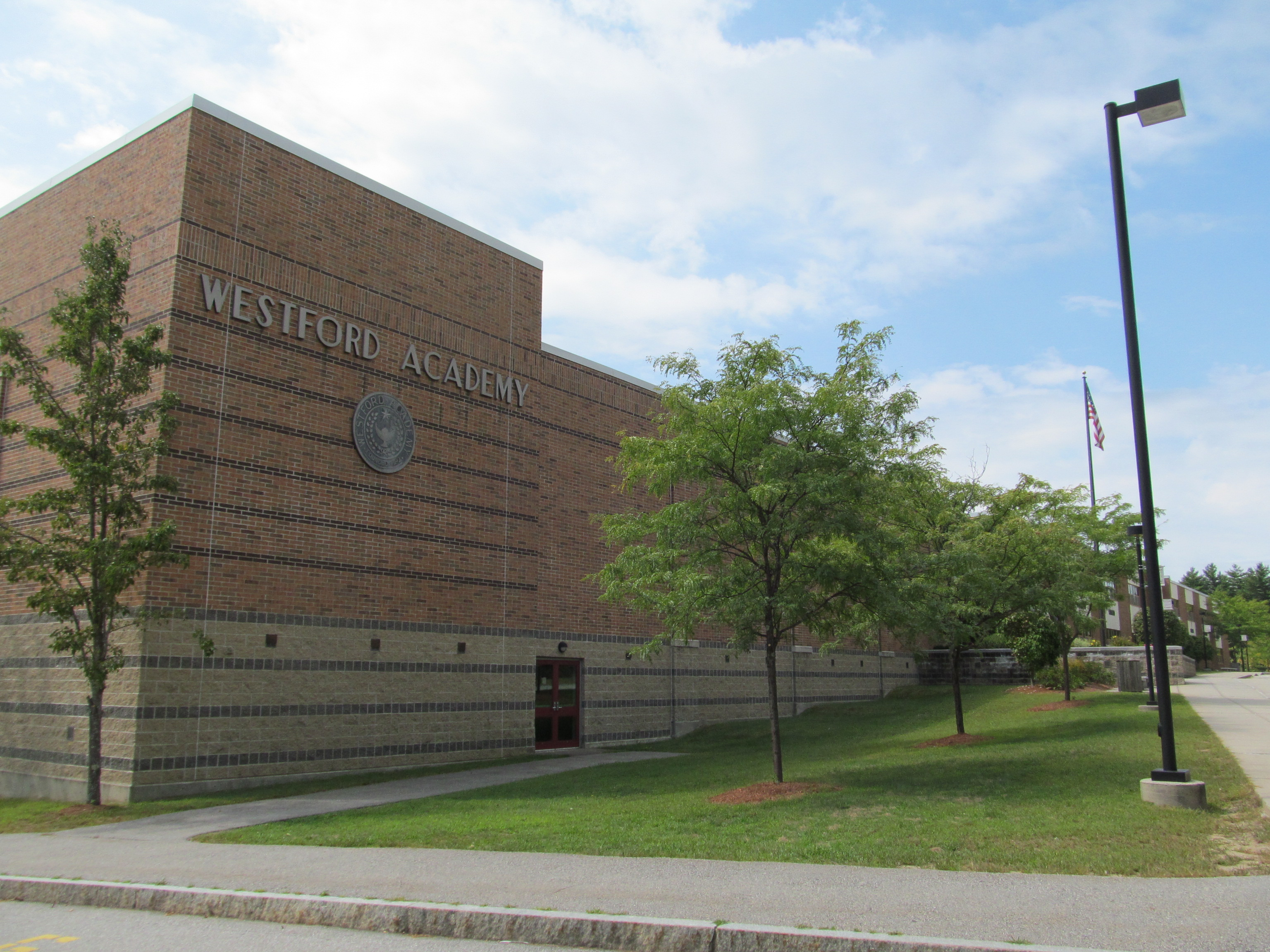
- Westford Academy
- 30 Patten Road, Westford, Massachusetts; United States

Information
- Type: Public; Secondary; Open enrollment
- Established: 1792
- School district: Westford Public Schools
- Superintendent: Christopher Chew
- Dean: Amanda Welch; Robert Ware; Betsy Murphy
- Principal: Dan Twomey
- Faculty: 116.9 (on an FTE basis)
- Grades: 9–12
- Enrollment: 1,567 (2021-2022)
- Student to teacher ratio: 14.1 to 1
- Campus type: Suburban
- Colors: Maroon and grey
- Athletics conference: Dual County League (DCL)
- Mascot: Ghosts
- Accreditation: NEASC
- Newspaper: WA Ghostwriter
- Website: Westford Academy

Westford Academy is the public high school for the town of Westford, Massachusetts, United States. It was incorporated in 1792 and is one of the oldest public high schools in the United States.

== History ==
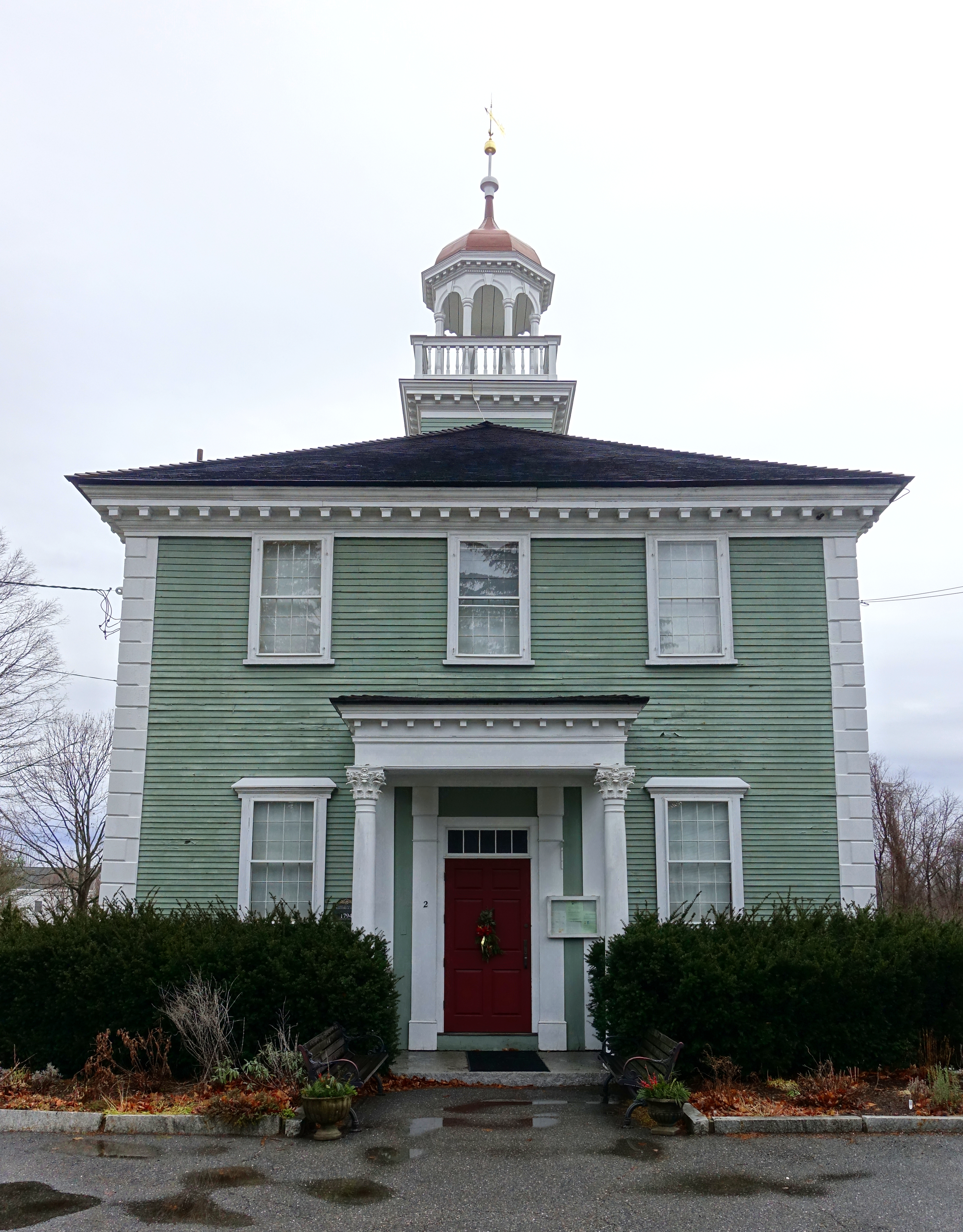
First Westford Academy Building (1794-1896).

Westford Academy (WA) was founded as a private school in 1792, "for children 'of any nation, age, or sex.'" As long as students could read the Bible and pay the required 9 shillings a term, both boys and girls were allowed to attend.

WA became a public school in 1928 after a town meeting vote on April 30, 1928, when "the residents of Westford agreed to purchase the "Westford Academy" from the Trustees of the academy." A group of trustees has been retained to this day, and they bestow scholarships upon graduating seniors at an annual ceremony in May.

There have been four Westford Academy buildings:

- First Westford Academy building (1794–1896) on Boston Road. This building currently serves as the Westford Museum.
- Second Westford Academy Building (1897–1955) on Main Street. This building is now the Roudenbush Community Center.
- Third Westford Academy Building (1956–1972) on Depot Road. This building is now the Abbot School.
- Fourth Westford Academy Building (1973 to present) on Patten Road.

In October 2019, Westford celebrated the 225th anniversary of Westford Academy.

== Academics ==
Students at Westford Academy are required to take courses in English, Math, Science, Social Studies, Physical Education, and Foreign Language in order to graduate. Courses are offered at the Advanced Placement, Honors, College Prep, and Foundations level.

=== Awards and recognition ===
Westford Academy is accredited by the New England Association of Schools and Colleges (NEASC).

On October 9, 2008, Westford Academy was honored as a Blue Ribbon School. "The No Child Left Behind-Blue Ribbon Schools Program is an award that honors public and private elementary, middle and high schools that are either academically superior, or that have demonstrated dramatic gains in student achievement... satisfying the U.S. Department of Education’s criteria for being 'in the top 10 percent of all schools on state assessment scores in both reading (language arts or English) and mathematics, regardless of their demographics.'"

In their 2021 rankings, U.S. News & World Report ranked WA as #27 in Boston Metro Area High Schools, #30 in Massachusetts High Schools, and #754 in their National Rankings. In 2021, Boston Magazine ranked WA as #13 on their list of "Best Public High Schools in Boston".

In 2014, four WA students won "the title 'Best in Nation' in the Verizon Innovative App Challenge... [the] app... helps children learn chemistry using a 3D simulator... [and] creates 3D simulations of equipment, different chemicals and reactions that occur in chemistry experiments, such as simulating flame tests and adding together chemicals in a beaker... Westford Academy received a $20,000 grant accumulated from winnings of both the regional and national competition to support science, technology, engineering, and mathematics programs in school."

== Athletics ==

Westford Academy participates in the DCL (Dual County League), which is part of the Massachusetts Interscholastic Athletic Association (MIAA) and offers a number of athletic opportunities for students. Westford Academy Girls Varsity Ice Hockey team also allows girls from the Littleton High School to join the team. Westford also teams up with Littleton for their Crew Team.

Sports teams include cheerleading, soccer, golf, field hockey, football, swimming & diving, basketball, ice hockey, gymnastics, alpine skiing, indoor track, wrestling, Nordic skiing, women's ice hockey, track and field, lacrosse, tennis, softball, baseball, fencing, crew, and volleyball.

=== Soccer ===
Westford Academy Girls Soccer (WAGS) is historically one of the most successful athletic teams at WA. In 2017, the Westford Academy Girls Soccer team made it to the Division 1 state championship game, losing in double overtime to Wachusett, 2–1. In 2020, the team defeated rival Concord-Carlisle to advance to the DCL championship, but lost in the final against Newton South 2–0.

=== Swim and dive ===
Both the girls and boys swimming and diving teams are highly competitive programs, with particular dominance attained by the girls program in recent years. As the Boston Globe reported, "the Grey Ghosts [girls team has] strung together six consecutive undefeated seasons, winning eight of the last nine MIAA Division 1 titles... [the Boys] hoisted the Division 1 trophy in 2015 and have finished in the top six every year since 2011."

=== Basketball ===
In 2017, the WA girls basketball team won both DCL title and the Division 1 Central title, "unfortunately for the Ghosts, the run came to an end in the state semifinal, with eventual state champ Springfield Central downing Westford by the final of 61–45." The following year the Girls Basketball team once again made it to the Division 1 Central finals, losing to Wachusett 54–47.

On January 27, 2018, both the Girls and Boys basketball teams were invited to play at the Good Sports TD Garden Invitational. "Each member of the Westford Academy boys and girls basketball teams dealt with the excitement of playing in the home of the Boston Celtics... The boys fell to Algonquin, 71–53, while the WA girls lost a heartbreaker to Wachusett, 45–41."

Each year, the Westford Academy Booster Club organizes a charity basketball game against members of the New England Patriots including famous players such a Julian Edelman and Rob Gronkowski.

=== Nordic ski ===
The WA Nordic ski team "perennially finishes in the top half of the Mass. Bay West League and [from 2013–2017] both the boys’ and girls’ programs have finished in the top 10 at the state team championships."

=== Alpine ski ===
In 2020, the boys Alpine ski team won the Mass Bay West League title.

=== Softball ===
In 2015, the Softball team entered the North Division 1 softball tournament as the 19th seed. "Westford advanced to the final after defeating No. 5 seed Revere, 4–2," but ultimately lost in the final to Methuen.

=== Baseball ===
In 2019, the WA Baseball team lost on a walkoff in the Division 1 North quarterfinal to rival Lincoln-Sudbury Regional High School with a final score of 9–8.

== Mascot controversy ==
Between 1956 and 1958, Westford Academy's mascot was the Black Knights. "The 1959 yearbook specifically stated that WA teams would no longer use the symbol after the 1958 season... The familiar Grey Ghost — and associated maroon and gray colors — were adopted and applied starting in 1959... This change was related to new, differently colored uniforms. Research suggests the ghost was inspired by the title of a popular TV series at the time, 'The Gray Ghost'".

Beginning in 2019, there has been controversy concerning the mascot. "The original Grey Ghost was Colonel John Mosby, a Confederate officer who led a partisan cavalry unit known as Mosby's Rangers during the Civil War. Mosby was fiercely loyal to Virginia, but also disliked slavery, becoming involved in politics after the war, eventually becoming the U.S. Ambassador to Hong Kong in the Ulysses S. Grant administration. His exploits were turned into a television show in the late 1950s that was apparently popular with Westford Academy students of the time, who chose Mosby's nickname as the replacement nickname during a contest to replace the school's former one: the Black Knights."

In 2020, a WA alumni started a Change.org petition to Replace the Grey Ghost mascot that received over 500 signatures. In September 2021, as a response to the aforementioned petition receiving substantial attention, a WA student started another Change.org petition to Save the Grey Ghost mascot that received over 1,000 signatures. The Westford community remains divided over the issue of whether or not to change the mascot.

In September 2021, Superintendent Dr. Christopher Chew released a statement explaining, "While there may be a lack of clarity around the true origin of the mascot, there is no ambiguity that Westford Public Schools must be a welcoming place for all students and families... And if our mascot is preventing students from feeling like this is their school district or their community, then we obviously have more work to do."

On November 22, 2021, the Westford School Committee unanimously voted to change the mascot from the Grey Ghosts to the Ghosts.

== Extracurricular activities ==
Westford Academy offers a number of clubs and extracurriculars including: A World of Difference (ADL program), Anime Club, Asian Culture Club, Beyond Words (literary magazine), Book Club, Chess Club, Cirrus Outdoor Adventure Club, Colorguard, Dance Club, Entrepreneurship Club, Equestrian Club, French Club, German Club, Ghostwriter (Student Newspaper), Gender & Sexuality Alliance (GSA), HOSA, Human Rights Club, International Club, Investment Club, Jazz Band, Jewish Student Union (JSU), Junior State of America (JSA), Latin Club, Marching Band, Math Team, Mock Trial, Model UN, Museum Club, Outing Club, Software Club, SADD & Herren Project, Science Team, Ski Club, Smash Club, Spanish Club, Speech and Debate Team, Troubadors, WA Acapella, WA Friends/Best Buddies, and Women in STEM.

=== Theatre Arts ===
Westford Academy Theater Arts (WATA) puts on four main stage and three black box productions each year. WATA has won eight state championships (2008, 2010–2015, 2019) at the Massachusetts Educational Theater Guild's annual play festival. Since 2009, WATA has entered the Theater at the Mount Youth Awards at Mount Wachusett Community College, which celebrate excellence and achievement in high school musical theatre. In 2013 WATA's production of Evita won for "Best Overall Production" and in 2017 WATA's production of Spring Awakening won Best Musical.

=== DECA ===
The Westford Academy chapter of DECA is the largest in the state, with over 400 members. The club is open to all WA students, grades 9–12, who are enrolled in at least one business class for each school year of their participation. As the WA Ghostwriter reported in 2020, "For over ten years, WA DECA has had significant successes at both district, state and international level conventions. They competed in 30 events and have 39 qualifiers for ICDC, DECA’s international conference (USA and Canada), where competitors who achieved top 5 in their events at states compete on the international level."

=== Robotics ===
Westford Academy has a FIRST Tech Challenge team called "Ghost Robotics". Ghost Robotics is a school-sponsored team open to all WA students. In 2022, the team won the Massachusetts State Championship at Natick High School.

=== Quiz Team ===
The WA High School Quiz Team competed in WGBH's High School Quiz Show in 2014, 2019, and 2021. In 2019, WA lost in the Qualifying Round to multi-year champion Andover with a score of 175 to Andover's 625. In 2021, the WA team lost in the Qualifying Round with a score of 800 to AMSA's 940.

== Incidents ==
In 2004, Westford Academy math teacher Rosemarie Pumo pled guilty to distributing heroin to her students and was incarcerated at MCI-Framingham. Two years later, "Stony Brook middle school teacher... Jessica Palkes faced charges of heroin possession. She pleaded not guilty at the time, but the incident prompted Westford town officials to call for drug testing of newly hired teachers -- a program that is currently in place."

In January 2020, a student executing the outlet challenge, a viral internet challenge which emerged over the TikTok social media platform, led to a building evacuation after smoke was noticed leaving power outlets.

On January 28, 2022, a group of WA students attending a varsity women’s basketball game allegedly made racist, insensitive, and disparaging remarks to a black student on the Wayland High School team.

== Notable alumni ==
- James Arciero (class of 1993), American state legislator serving in the Massachusetts House of Representatives.
- Loammi Baldwin Jr., American civil engineer.
- Pat Bradley (class of 1969), LPGA Hall of Fame Golfer.
- Connor Degenhardt (class of 2017), professional football player
- Sarah Carter Edgarton Mayo, writer and editor.
- Pamela Gay (class of 1992), astronomer and podcaster
- Sarah Dix Hamlin (class of 1859), American educator and founder of the Hamlin School
- John Revere (enrolled 1799), Paul Revere's son.
- Ellen Swallow Richards, chemist, home economist, and first female student and instructor at MIT.
- Alexa St. Martin, professional soccer player.
- Charles Mears, politician
- Aaron Stanford (class of 1995), actor.
- Nettie Maria Stevens (class of 1880), early American geneticist and researcher.
