= Connor Degenhardt =

American football player (born 1998)

No. 17
- Position: Quarterback

Personal information
- Born: December 16, 1998 (age 27); Westford, Massachusetts, U.S.
- Listed height: 6 ft 6 in (1.98 m)
- Listed weight: 227 lb (103 kg)

Career information
- High school: Westford Academy (Westford, Massachusetts)
- College: Holy Cross (2017–2020); New Haven (2021–2022)
- NFL draft: 2023: undrafted

Career history

Playing
- Arlington Renegades (2024)*; Massachusetts Pirates (2024)
- * Offseason or practice squad member only

Coaching
- New Haven (2024) Quarterbacks coach

Awards and highlights
- First-team All-NE-10 (2022); NE-10 Offensive Player of the Year (2022); Second-team All-NE-10 (2021); Second-team All-Patriot League (2019)

Connor Degenhardt (born December 16, 1998) is an American former football player and college football coach. He played collegiately for the Holy Cross Crusaders and New Haven Chargers and professionally for the Massachusetts Pirates of the Indoor Football League (IFL) as a quarterback.

== College career ==
After throwing for over 5,000 yards and 44 touchdowns in his career with Westford Academy, Degenhardt committed to play college football from Holy Cross. He did not play his freshman year. In his sophomore season he appeared in two games against Boston College and Lehigh. In his junior year he was named starter and started all thirteen games for the Crusaders. He led the team to a 7–6 record while also earning Second Team All-Patriot League honors. In his senior season that was shortened and moved to the spring due to COVID-19, he was voted as a team captain. He appeared in all four spring games and went undefeated in his two starts. After the season he transferred to New Haven as he earned an extra year of eligibility due to COVID-19.

In Degenhardt's first season with New Haven he earned Second Team All-NE-10 honors. He led the team to a 10–2 record and an appearance in the NCAA Division II playoffs. He finished the season with a career-high in completion percentage with 59.3% and a career-high fifteen rushing touchdowns. In his senior season he started all eleven games for the Chargers and lead them to an 8–3 record. He threw for a career-high 29 touchdown passes and earned First Team All-NE-10 honors along with being named the conference's Offensive Player of the Year.

=== Statistics ===
Year	Team	Games		Passing								Rushing			
Year	Team	GP	Record	Comp	Att	Pct	Yards	Avg	TD	Int	Rate	Att	Yards	Avg	TD
2017	Holy Cross	DNP													
2018	Holy Cross	2	0–0	0	1	0.0	0	0.0	0	0	0.0	1	-1	-1.0	0
2019	Holy Cross	13	7–6	182	341	53.4	2,372	7.0	14	8	120.7	85	55	0.6	5
2020–21	Holy Cross	4	2–0	21	38	55.3	147	3.9	2	1	99.9	17	22	1.3	0
2021	New Haven	12	10–2	166	280	59.3	2,122	7.6	18	4	141.3	84	161	1.9	15
2022	New Haven	11	8–3	168	287	58.5	2,251	7.8	29	5	154.3	72	59	0.8	6
Career		42	27−11	537	947	56.7	6,892	7.3	63	18	136.0	259	296	1.1	26

== Professional career ==
Pre-draft measurables
Height	Weight	Arm length	Hand span	40-yard dash	10-yard split	20-yard split	20-yard shuttle	Three-cone drill	Vertical jump	Broad jump
6 ft 5 in (1.96 m)	227 lb (103 kg)	30 3/4 in (0.78 m)	9 1/4 in (0.23 m)	4.76 s	1.62 s	2.71 s	4.49 s	7.50 s	31 1/2 in (0.80 m)	9 ft 6 in (2.90 m)
All values from Harvard / UConn Pro Day.

After going undrafted in the 2023 NFL draft, Degenhardt was selected by the Arlington Renegades of the XFL in the 2023 XFL Rookie Draft on June 16, 2023. He was signed on December 14, 2023. He was not part of the roster after the 2024 UFL dispersal draft on January 15, 2024.

Degenhardt signed with the Massachusetts Pirates of the Indoor Football League (IFL) for the 2024 season.

== Coaching career ==
In August 2024, Degenhardt was hired as the quarterbacks coach for his alma mater, New Haven. He did not return in 2025.
