= 1840 United States census =

Sixth US census

- June 1, 1840
- Seal of the United States Marshals Service, which administered the census

General information
- Country: United States
- Authority: Office of the United States Marshal

Results
- Total population: 17,069,453 (▲32.7%)
- Most populous state: New York; 2,428,921
- Least populous state: Delaware; 78,085

The 1840 United States census was the sixth census of the United States. Conducted by U.S. marshals on June 1, 1840, it determined the resident population of the United States to be 17,069,453 – an increase of 32.7 percent over the 12,866,020 persons enumerated during the 1830 census. The total population included 2,487,355 slaves. In 1840, the center of population was about 260 miles (418 km) west of Washington, D.C., near Weston, Virginia (now in West Virginia).

This was the first census in which:

- A state recorded a population of over two million (New York)
- A city recorded a population of over 300,000 (New York)
- Multiple cities recorded populations of over 100,000 (New York, Baltimore, and New Orleans)

This was the last census conducted by U.S. marshals, as starting in 1850 a temporary office would be set up for each census under the purview of the Department of the Interior. This was due to the Northern members of the Whig Party opposing the controversial claim in the 1840 census that free Black Americans in the Northern United States suffered from a higher degree of "insane" or "idiotic" behavior compared to enslaved Black Americans.

== Controversy over statistics for mental illness among Northern blacks ==
The 1840 census was the first that attempted to count Americans who were "insane" or "idiotic". Published results of the census indicated that alarming numbers of black persons living in non-slaveholding States were mentally ill, in striking contrast to the corresponding figures for slaveholding States.

Pro-slavery advocates trumpeted the results as evidence of the beneficial effects of slavery, and the probable consequences of emancipation. Anti-slavery advocates contended, on the contrary, that the published returns were riddled with errors, as detailed in an 1844 report by Edward Jarvis of Massachusetts in the American Journal of the Medical Sciences, later published separately as a pamphlet, and in a memorial from the American Statistical Association to Congress, praying that measures be taken to correct the errors.

The memorial was submitted to the House of Representatives by John Quincy Adams, who contended that it demonstrated "a multitude of gross and important errors" in the published returns. In response to the House's request for an inquiry, Secretary of State John C. Calhoun reported that a careful examination of the statistics by the supervisor of the census had fully sustained their correctness. The returns were not revised.

== Census questions ==
The 1840 census asked these questions:

- Name of head of family
- Address
- Number of free white males and females
  - in five-year age groups to age 20
  - in 10-year age groups from 20 to 100
  - 100 years and older
- number of slaves and free colored persons in six age groups
- number of deaf and dumb, by race
- number of blind, by race
- number of insane and idiotic in public or private charge, by race
- number of persons in each family employed in seven classes of occupation
- number of schools and number of scholars
- number of white persons over 20 who could not read and write
- number of pensioners for Revolutionary or military service

== Data availability ==
No microdata from the 1840 population census are available, but aggregate data for small areas, together with compatible cartographic boundary files, can be downloaded from the National Historical Geographic Information System. A compendium of data from the sixth census, organized by States, counties, and principal towns is available on the web site of the Census Bureau.

== State rankings ==
| Rank | State | Population |
|---|---|---|
| 1 | New York | 2,428,921 |
| 2 | Pennsylvania | 1,724,033 |
| 3 | Ohio | 1,519,467 |
| 4 | Virginia | 1,239,792 |
| 5 | Tennessee | 829,210 |
| 6 | Kentucky | 779,828 |
| 7 | North Carolina | 753,419 |
| 8 | Massachusetts | 737,699 |
| 9 | Georgia | 691,392 |
| 10 | Indiana | 685,866 |
| 11 | South Carolina | 594,398 |
| 12 | Alabama | 590,756 |
| 13 | Maine | 501,793 |
| 14 | Illinois | 476,183 |
| 15 | Maryland | 470,019 |
| 16 | Missouri | 383,702 |
| 17 | Mississippi | 375,651 |
| 18 | New Jersey | 373,306 |
| 19 | Louisiana | 352,411 |
| 20 | Connecticut | 309,978 |
| 21 | Vermont | 291,948 |
| 22 | New Hampshire | 284,574 |
| X | West Virginia | 224,537 |
| 23 | Michigan | 212,267 |
| 24 | Rhode Island | 108,830 |
| 25 | Arkansas | 97,574 |
| 26 | Delaware | 78,085 |
| X | Florida | 54,477 |
| X | Iowa | 43,112 |
| X | District of Columbia | 33,745 |
| X | Wisconsin | 30,945 |

== City rankings ==
| Rank | City | State | Population | Region (2016) |
|---|---|---|---|---|
| 01 | New York | New York | 312,710 | Northeast |
| 02 | Baltimore | Maryland | 102,313 | South |
| 03 | New Orleans | Louisiana | 102,193 | South |
| 04 | Philadelphia | Pennsylvania | 93,665 | Northeast |
| 05 | Boston | Massachusetts | 93,383 | Northeast |
| 06 | Cincinnati | Ohio | 46,338 | Midwest |
| 07 | Brooklyn | New York | 36,233 | Northeast |
| 08 | Northern Liberties | Pennsylvania | 34,474 | Northeast |
| 09 | Albany | New York | 33,721 | Northeast |
| 10 | Charleston | South Carolina | 29,261 | South |
| 11 | Spring Garden | Pennsylvania | 27,849 | Northeast |
| 12 | Southwark | Pennsylvania | 27,548 | Northeast |
| 13 | Washington | District of Columbia | 23,364 | South |
| 14 | Providence | Rhode Island | 23,171 | Northeast |
| 15 | Kensington | Pennsylvania | 22,314 | Northeast |
| 16 | Louisville | Kentucky | 21,210 | South |
| 17 | Pittsburgh | Pennsylvania | 21,115 | Northeast |
| 18 | Lowell | Massachusetts | 20,796 | Northeast |
| 19 | Rochester | New York | 20,191 | Northeast |
| 20 | Richmond | Virginia | 20,153 | South |
| 21 | Troy | New York | 19,334 | Northeast |
| 22 | Buffalo | New York | 18,213 | Northeast |
| 23 | Newark | New Jersey | 17,290 | Northeast |
| 24 | St. Louis | Missouri | 16,469 | Midwest |
| 25 | Portland | Maine | 15,218 | Northeast |
| 26 | Salem | Massachusetts | 15,082 | Northeast |
| 27 | Moyamensing | Pennsylvania | 14,573 | Northeast |
| 28 | New Haven | Connecticut | 12,960 | Northeast |
| 29 | Utica | New York | 12,782 | Northeast |
| 30 | Mobile | Alabama | 12,672 | South |
| 31 | New Bedford | Massachusetts | 12,087 | Northeast |
| 32 | Charlestown | Massachusetts | 11,484 | Northeast |
| 33 | Savannah | Georgia | 11,214 | South |
| 34 | Petersburg | Virginia | 11,136 | South |
| 35 | Springfield | Massachusetts | 10,985 | Northeast |
| 36 | Norfolk | Virginia | 10,920 | South |
| 37 | Allegheny | Pennsylvania | 10,089 | Northeast |
| 38 | Smithfield | Rhode Island | 9,534 | Northeast |
| 39 | Hartford | Connecticut | 9,468 | Northeast |
| 40 | Lynn | Massachusetts | 9,367 | Northeast |
| 41 | Detroit | Michigan | 9,102 | Midwest |
| 42 | Roxbury | Massachusetts | 9,089 | Northeast |
| 43 | Nantucket | Massachusetts | 9,012 | Northeast |
| 44 | Bangor | Maine | 8,627 | Northeast |
| 45 | Alexandria | District of Columbia | 8,459 | South |
| 46 | Lancaster | Pennsylvania | 8,417 | Northeast |
| 47 | Reading | Pennsylvania | 8,410 | Northeast |
| 48 | Cambridge | Massachusetts | 8,409 | Northeast |
| 49 | Wilmington | Delaware | 8,367 | South |
| 50 | Newport | Rhode Island | 8,333 | Northeast |
| 51 | Portsmouth | New Hampshire | 7,887 | Northeast |
| 52 | Wheeling | Virginia | 7,885 | South |
| 53 | Taunton | Massachusetts | 7,645 | Northeast |
| 54 | Paterson | New Jersey | 7,596 | Northeast |
| 55 | Worcester | Massachusetts | 7,497 | Northeast |
| 56 | Georgetown | District of Columbia | 7,312 | South |
| 57 | Newburyport | Massachusetts | 7,161 | Northeast |
| 58 | Lexington | Kentucky | 6,997 | South |
| 59 | Nashville | Tennessee | 6,929 | South |
| 60 | Schenectady | New York | 6,784 | Northeast |
| 61 | Fall River | Massachusetts | 6,738 | Northeast |
| 62 | Warwick | Rhode Island | 6,726 | Northeast |
| 63 | Portsmouth | Virginia | 6,477 | South |
| 64 | Dover | New Hampshire | 6,458 | Northeast |
| 65 | Augusta | Georgia | 6,403 | South |
| 66 | Lynchburg | Virginia | 6,395 | South |
| 67 | Gloucester | Massachusetts | 6,350 | Northeast |
| 68 | Cleveland | Ohio | 6,071 | Midwest |
| 69 | Dayton | Ohio | 6,067 | Midwest |
| 70 | Middletown | New Jersey | 6,063 | Northeast |
| 71 | Nashua | New Hampshire | 6,054 | Northeast |
| 72 | Columbus | Ohio | 6,048 | Midwest |
| 73 | Harrisburg | Pennsylvania | 5,980 | Northeast |
| 74 | Hudson | New York | 5,672 | Northeast |
| 75 | Auburn | New York | 5,626 | Northeast |
| 76 | Marblehead | Massachusetts | 5,575 | Northeast |
| 77 | New London | Connecticut | 5,519 | Northeast |
| 78 | Wilmington | North Carolina | 5,335 | South |
| 79 | Augusta | Maine | 5,314 | Northeast |
| 80 | Plymouth | Massachusetts | 5,281 | Northeast |
| 81 | Cumberland | Rhode Island | 5,225 | Northeast |
| 82 | Andover | Massachusetts | 5,207 | Northeast |
| 83 | Frederick | Maryland | 5,182 | South |
| 84 | Bath | Maine | 5,141 | Northeast |
| 85 | Middleborough | Massachusetts | 5,085 | Northeast |
| 86 | Evesham | New Jersey | 5,060 | Northeast |
| 87 | Gardiner | Maine | 5,042 | Northeast |
| 88 | Danvers | Massachusetts | 5,020 | Northeast |
| 89 | Concord | New Hampshire | 4,897 | Northeast |
| 90 | Dorchester | Massachusetts | 4,875 | Northeast |
| 91 | Easton | Pennsylvania | 4,865 | Northeast |
| 92 | Woodbridge | New Jersey | 4,821 | Northeast |
| 93 | York | Pennsylvania | 4,779 | Northeast |
| 94 | Zanesville | Ohio | 4,766 | Midwest |
| 95 | Beverly | Massachusetts | 4,689 | Northeast |
| 96 | Danbury | Connecticut | 4,504 | Northeast |
| 97 | Chicago | Illinois | 4,470 | Midwest |
| 98 | Carlisle | Pennsylvania | 4,351 | Northeast |
| 99 | Pottsville | Pennsylvania | 4,345 | Northeast |
| 100 | Columbia | South Carolina | 4,340 | South |

== Images ==
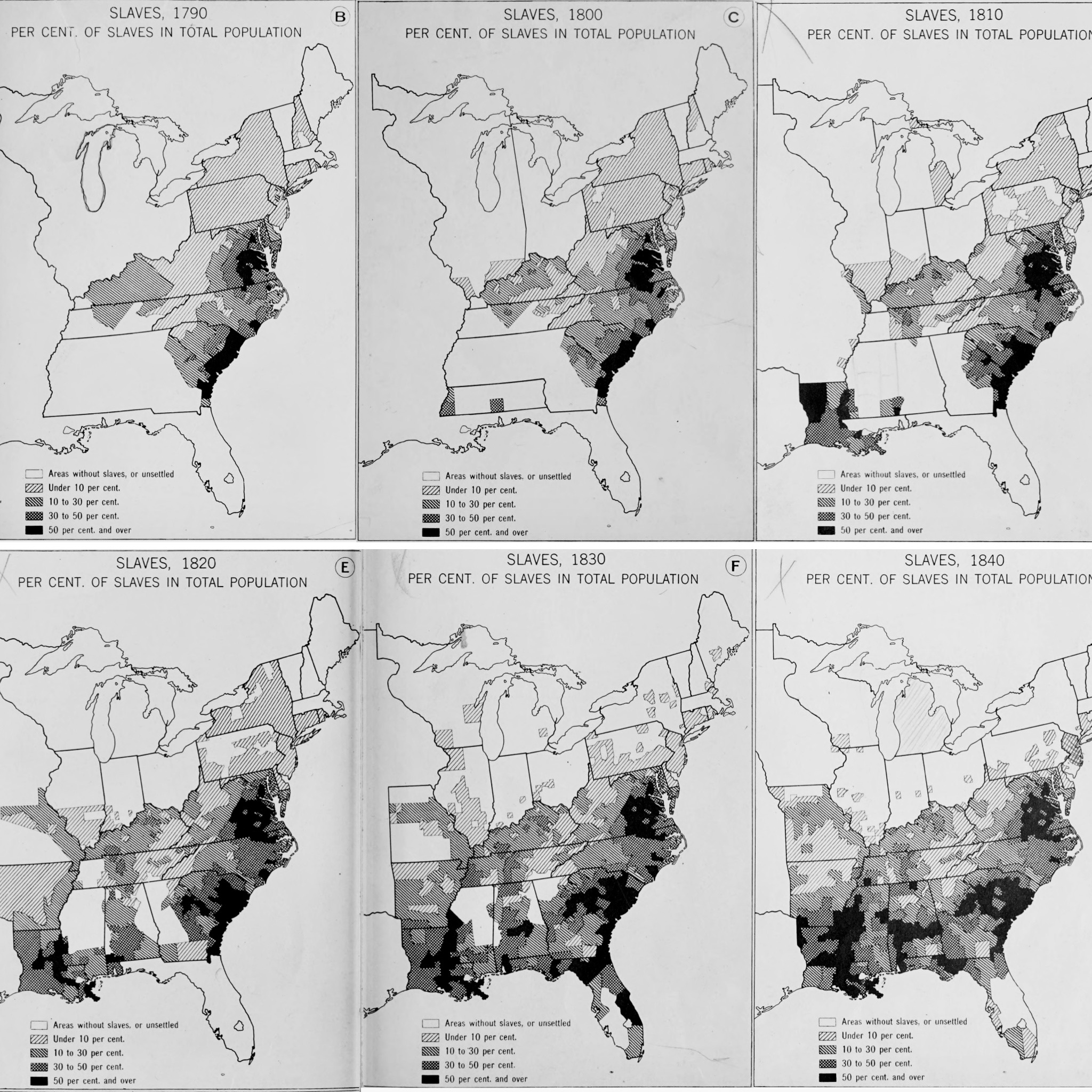
Slaves as a percentage of the total population from 1790 to 1840.
