= Henry Fletcher House =

Historic house in Massachusetts, United States

- U.S. National Register of Historic Places
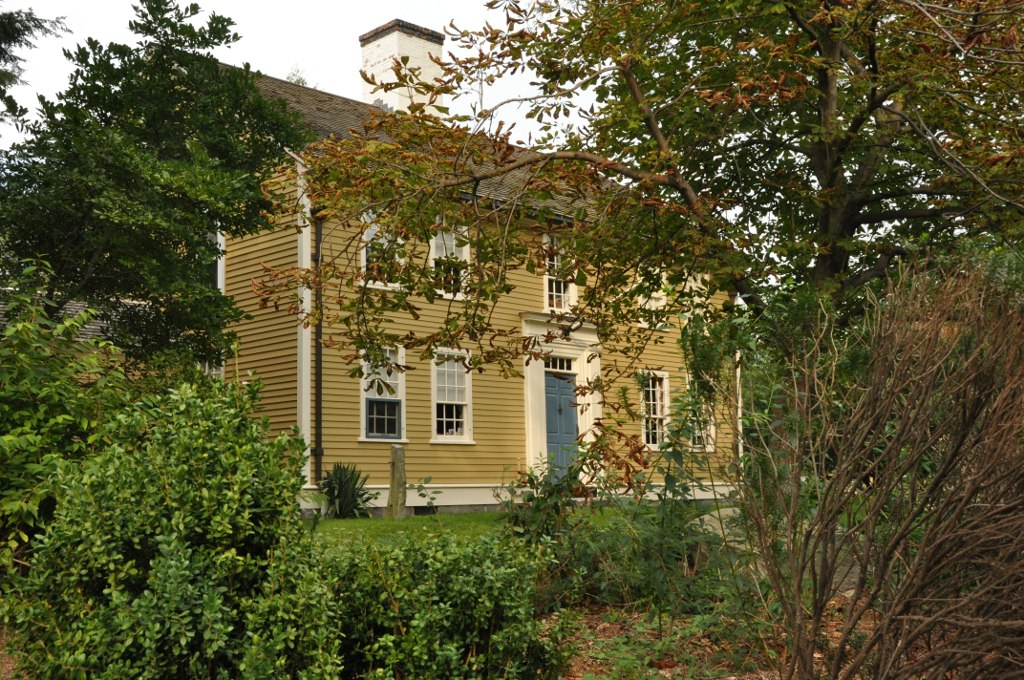

- Location within Massachusetts Location within the United States
- Location: Westford, Massachusetts
- Coordinates: 42°33′4″N 71°25′39″W
- Area: 10.6 acres (4.3 ha)
- Architect: Fletcher, Henry
- Architectural style: Georgian
- NRHP reference No.: 93000010
- Added to NRHP: September 30, 1993

The Henry Fletcher House is a historic house at 224 Concord Road in Westford, Massachusetts. Built c. 1810–13, it is a rare example of very late Georgian style timber-frame construction, with a large central chimney characteristic of colonial-era houses. It is styled with a mix of late Georgian and Federal style woodwork. The property's barn was also built by Henry Fletcher using the same construction methods. The house was listed on the National Register of Historic Places in 1993.

== Description and history ==
The Fletcher House is set on the north side of Concord Road (Massachusetts Route 225), just west of its junction with Preservation Way, in a rural-residential area of southern Westford. It is a 2 1/2-story timber-frame structure, five bays wide, with a side gable roof, clapboard siding, and a stone foundation. The main facade faces south, and is symmetrically arranged, with a center entrance flanked by pilasters and topped by a four-light transom window and simple entablature and cornice. The interior layout follows a typical Georgian center-chimney plan, with public rooms on either side of the chimney, and a kitchen area behind. Ells and minor additions, most of them 20th-century enlarge the house. The barn, which stands east of the house, is of similar construction as the house, but was enlarged in the 20th century with a balloon-framed addition.

The house and barn were built c. 1810–13 by Henry Fletcher, descended from one of the Westford area's first settlers. It is a distinctive retrograde example of Georgian architecture, at a time when it had been out of fashion for some time. The house is the subject of a historic preservation restriction held by Historic New England.

== See also ==
- National Register of Historic Places listings in Middlesex County, Massachusetts
