= Edward Jarvis (physician) =

American physician

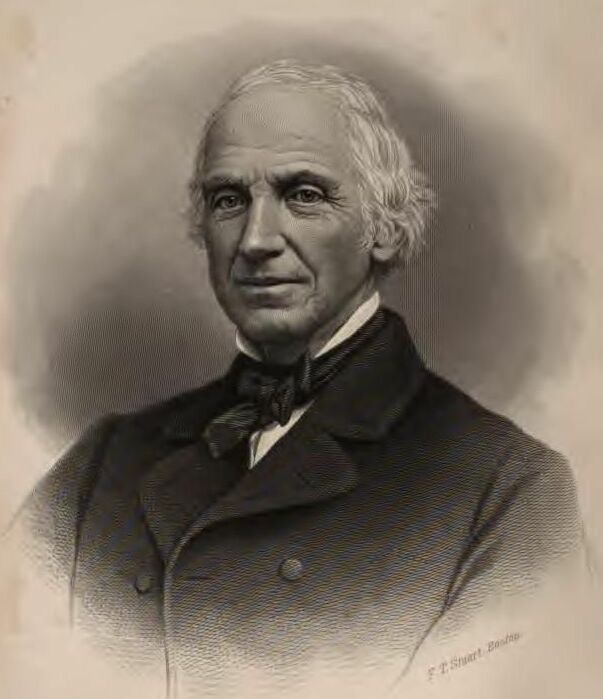
- Born: 9 January 1803; Concord, Massachusetts, U.S.
- Died: 31 October 1884 (aged 81); Dorchester, Massachusetts, U.S.
- Education: Westford Academy
- Alma mater: Harvard University
- Occupation: Physician

Edward Jarvis (9 January 1803, Concord, Massachusetts – 31 October 1884, Dorchester, Massachusetts) was an American medical doctor.

== Biography ==
He was descended from John Jarvis, a shipbuilder who emigrated from Yorkshire, England, to Boston in 1661. He attended public school in Concord, and Westford Academy. He graduated from Harvard in 1826. In 1827 he taught school in Concord, also studying with Josiah Bartlett. He graduated from the Boston Medical School in 1830, and practised in Northfield, Massachusetts, from 1830 to 1832. He practised in Concord until 1837. There he was influenced by statistician Lemuel Shattuck. After Concord, he practised in Louisville, Kentucky, from 1837 to 1842, and then in Dorchester, Massachusetts. He was elected a member of the American Antiquarian Society in 1854.

Jarvis made a sanitary survey of Massachusetts, by order of the government, and published a report (1855), and subsequently, by appointment of the United States Secretary of the Interior, he tabulated the mortality statistics of the United States as reported in the census of 1860, his work constituting one half of the fourth volume of the reports of the eighth census. He was a member of numerous learned societies, and was president of the American Statistical Association from 1852 until his death. In 1863, he was elected as a member to the American Philosophical Society.

Additionally, Jarvis wrote a large number of reports on public health, mortality rates, education, insanity, and other subjects. In his 1871 essay entitled Relation of Education to Insanity, Jarvis argued that too much education was directly linked to increased rates of insanity.

== Works ==
- Practical Physiology. Philadelphia. 1848.
- Primary Physiology for Schools. 1849.
