= Hamlin School =

Kindergarten through eighth grade non-profit independent school

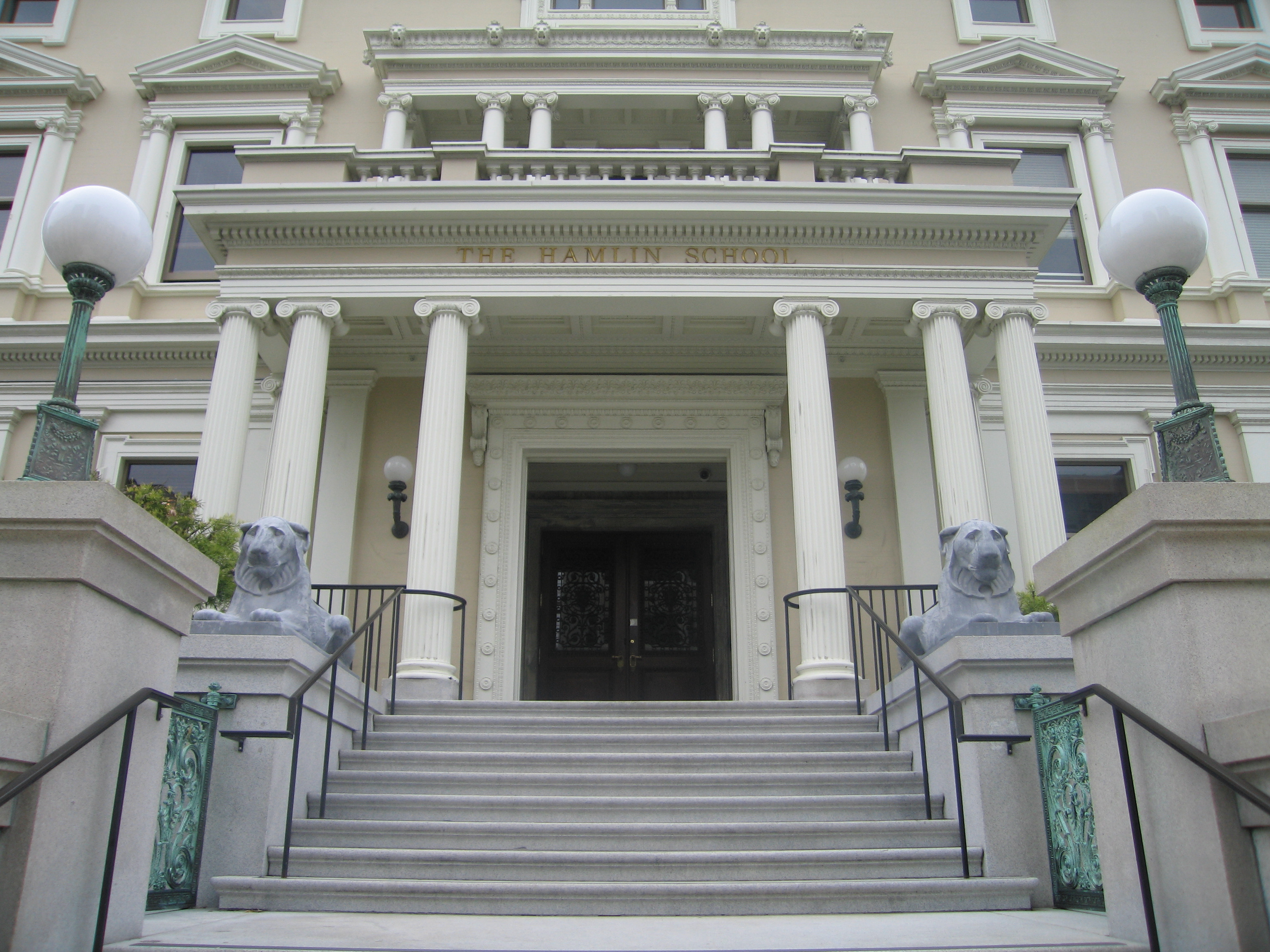

Location
- 2120 Broadway, San Francisco, California; United States
- 37.7951°N 122.4326°W

Information
- Former names: Miss Hamlin's School for Girls (1898–?)
- Type: Non-profit independent school
- Motto: Compassion - Courage - Honesty - Respect - Responsibility
- Established: 1896; 130 years ago
- Founder: Sarah Dix Hamlin (1844-1923)
- President: Wanda M. Holland Greene
- Teaching staff: 70
- Grades: Lower School: K-4; Middle School: 5-8
- Gender: Girls
- Enrollment: 440
- Colours: Red, gold
- Affiliations: Non-sectarian
- Website: hamlin.org

The Hamlin School (also known as The Hamlin School) is a private day school for girls in kindergarten through eighth grade. Its campus is at 2120 Broadway, San Francisco, near Pacific Heights.

== History ==
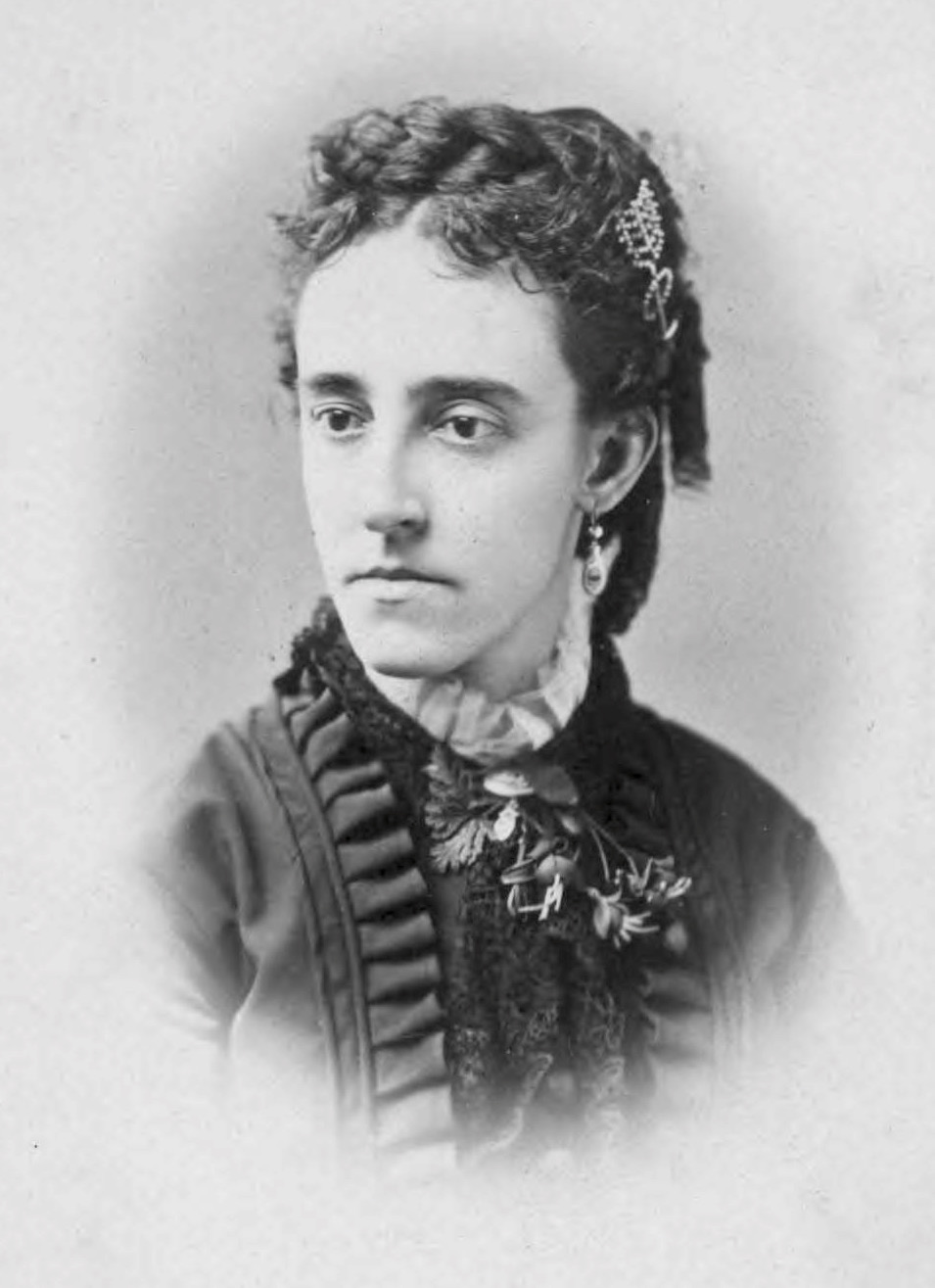
Sarah Dix Hamlin

In April 1896 Sarah Dix Hamlin purchased the Van Ness Seminary School at 1849 Jackson Street, San Francisco. In 1898, the school was renamed Miss Hamlin's School for Girls. In 1907, the school moved to a mansion at 2230 Pacific Avenue in San Francisco. On August 25, 1923, Hamlin died after a short illness.

== Academic program ==
The Middle School is from Grade 5 through 8. The teacher/student ratio is 1:7. The curriculum expands courses of the Lower School with elective courses offered in drama, dance, yearbook, computer science and music. Student social events include culture club, community service, literary magazine and student government.

== Notable graduates ==
- Katherine Feinstein ('75), attorney and judge; daughter of Dianne Feinstein
- Jennifer Dulski ('85), president and COO of Change.org
- Ivy Getty ('09), fashion model and philanthropist

== See also ==
- List of high schools in California
