= Fairview Cemetery (Westford, Massachusetts) =

Historic cemetery in Massachusetts, United States

- U.S. National Register of Historic Places
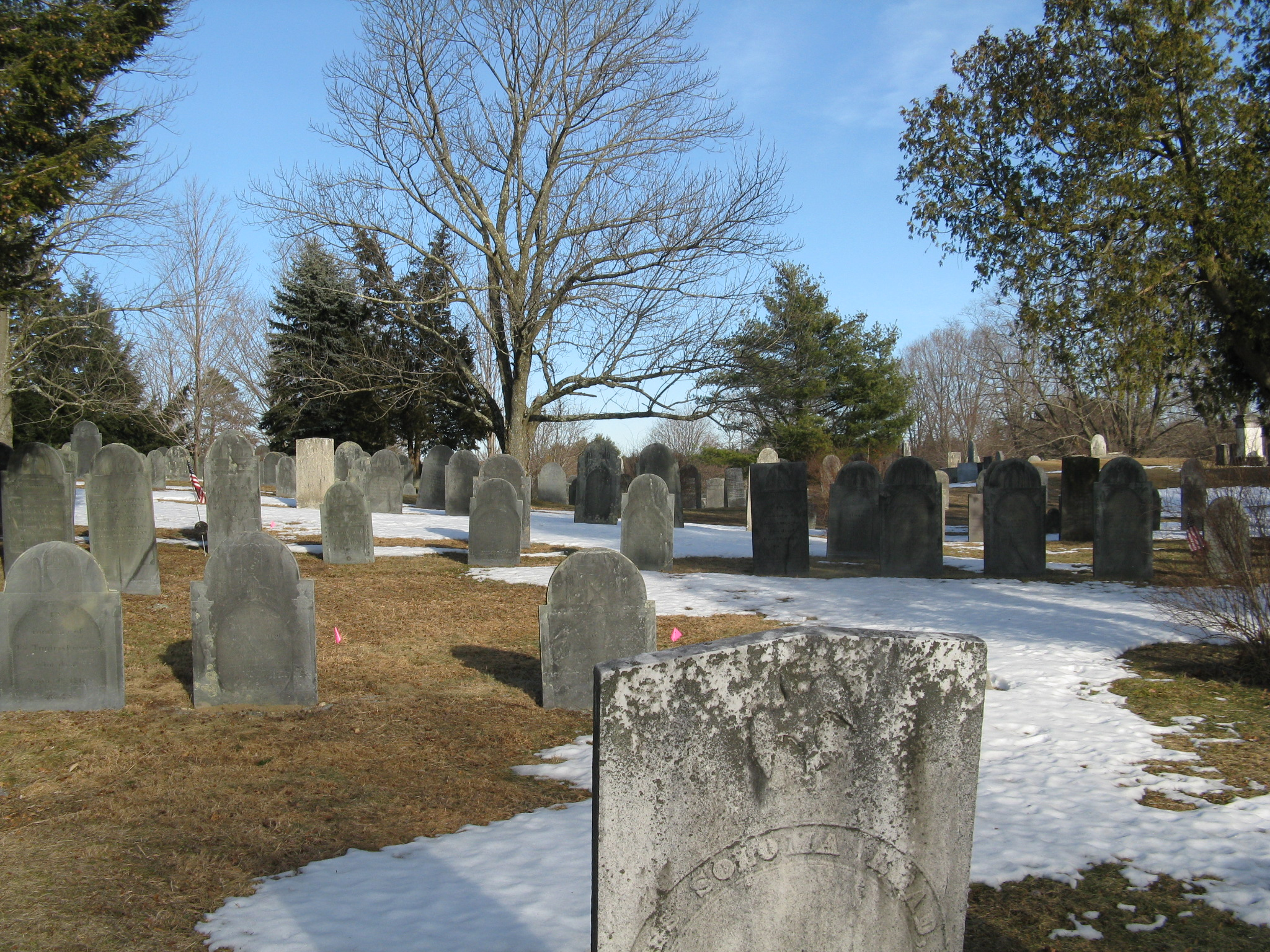
- Fairview Cemetery

- Location within Massachusetts Location within the United States
- Location: Westford, Massachusetts
- Coordinates: 42°35′13″N 71°25′15″W
- Area: 10.45 acres (4.23 ha)
- Built: 1876
- NRHP reference No.: 04001472
- Added to NRHP: January 12, 2005

Fairview Cemetery is a cemetery on Main Street in Westford, Massachusetts. This cemetery is located on Main Street at the corner of Tadmuck Road. It was originally called East Burying Ground and Snow Cemetery. The oldest tombstone dates to 1702, making it one of the town's oldest cemeteries. The cemetery sits on 10.5 acres, a substantial enlargement that began in the 1860s, when new portions of the cemetery were laid out in the then-fashionable rural cemetery style.

The cemetery was listed on the National Register of Historic Places in 2005.

== See also ==
- National Register of Historic Places listings in Middlesex County, Massachusetts
