= Westford, Massachusetts =

- Town
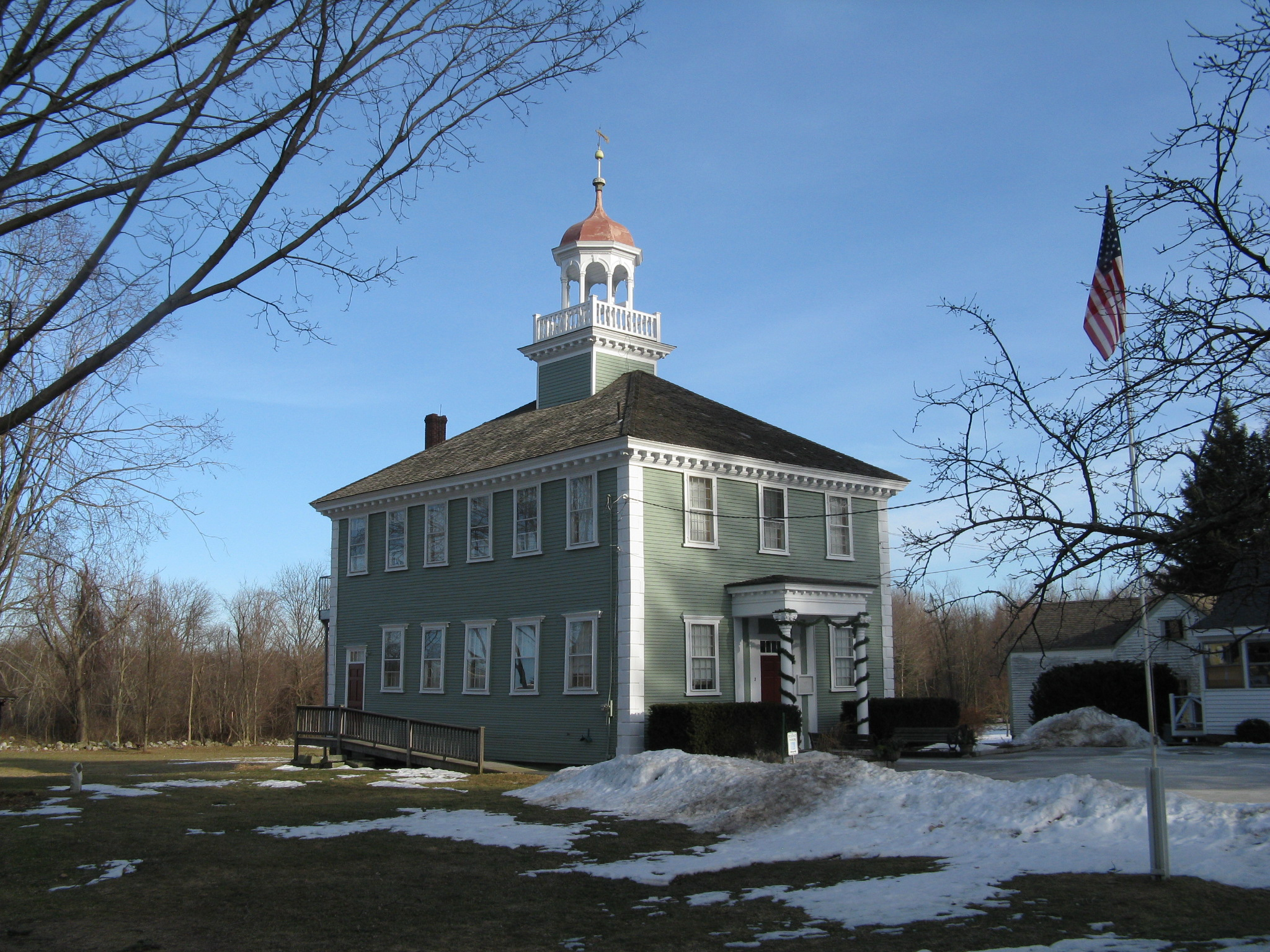
- Old Westford Academy, now the Westford Museum

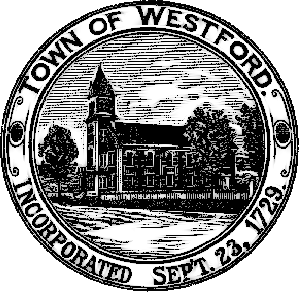
- Seal

- Location in Middlesex County in Massachusetts
- Coordinates: 42°34′45″N 71°26′18″W
- Country: United States
- State: Massachusetts
- County: Middlesex
- Region: New England
- Settled: 1635
- Incorporated: September 23, 1729

Government
  - Type: Open town meeting
  - Town Manager: Kristen Las

Area
  - Total: 31.3 sq mi (81.1 km^{2})
  - Land: 30.6 sq mi (79.3 km^{2})
  - Water: 0.73 sq mi (1.9 km^{2})
- Elevation: 407 ft (124 m)

Population (2020)
  - Total: 24,643
  - Density: 712/sq mi (274.8/km^{2})
- Time zone: UTC−5 (Eastern)
  - Summer (DST): UTC−4 (Eastern)
- ZIP Code: 01886
- Area code: 351/978
- FIPS code: 25-76135
- GNIS feature ID: 0618244
- Website: www.westfordma.gov

Westford is a town in Middlesex County, Massachusetts, United States. The population was at 24,643 at the time of the 2020 Census.

== History ==
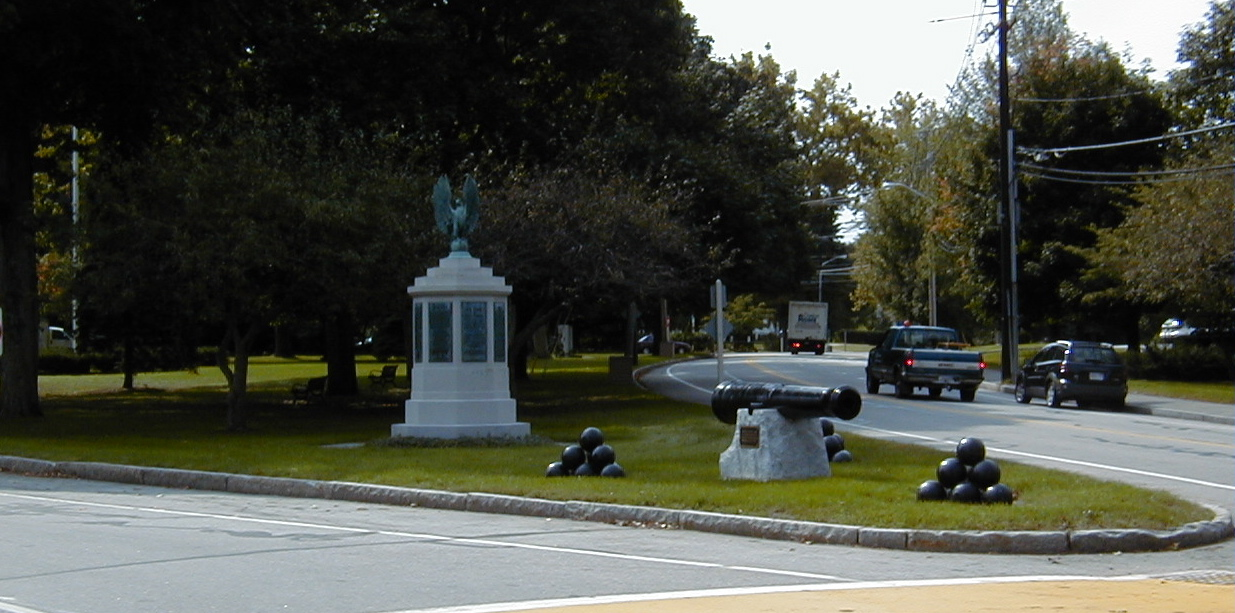
Westford Common, looking down Main Street

Westford began as 'West Chelmsford,' a village in the town of Chelmsford. The village of West Chelmsford grew large enough to sustain its own governance in 1729, and was officially incorporated as Westford that year on September 23.

In the late 18th and early 19th centuries, Westford primarily produced granite, apples, and worsted yarn. The Abbot Worsted Company was said to be the first company in the nation to use camel hair for worsted yarns.

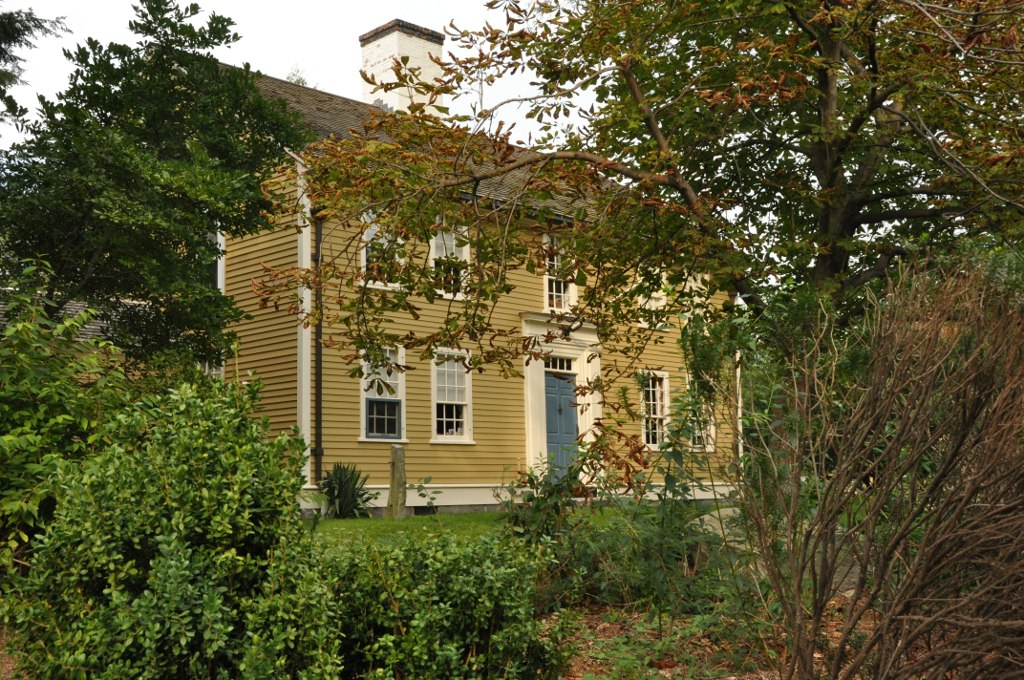
Henry Fletcher House was built c. 1813

Paul Revere's son attended Westford Academy and a bell cast by Revere graces its lobby today. A weather vane made by Paul Revere sits atop the Abbot Elementary school.

By the end of the American Civil War, as roads and transportation improved, Westford began to serve as a residential suburb for the factories of Lowell, becoming one of the earliest notable examples of suburban sprawl. Throughout the 20th century (and with the invention of the automobile), Westford progressively grew, continuing to serve as residential housing for the industries of Lowell, and later, Boston.

In the 1960s, the town was home to one of the research sites supporting Project West Ford.

By the 1970s, with the advent of the 128 Technology Belt, Westford began to act as a suburb for high-tech firms in Burlington, Woburn, and other areas, and later became a center of technology itself.

By the 1990s, Westford was home to offices for Cascade Communications (now part of Nokia), NETSCOUT, Red Hat, Samsung, Sonus Networks, Seagate, Iris Associates and many other technology firms, most located along Massachusetts Route 110, parallel to I-495. It is also the former North American headquarters for Puma.

== Geography ==
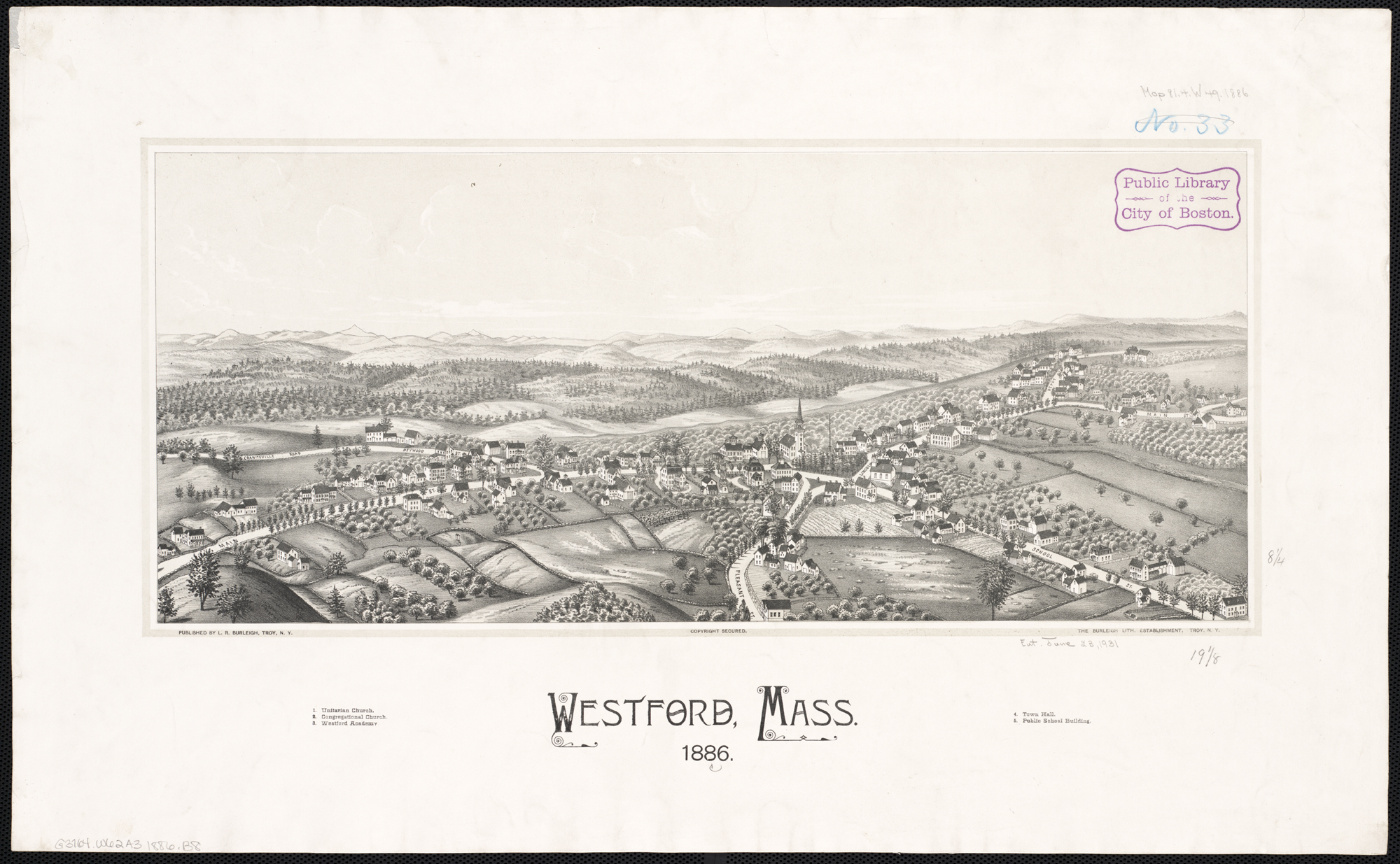
Lithograph of Westford from 1886 by L.R. Burleigh with list of landmarks

According to the United States Census Bureau, the town has a total area of 31.3 square miles (81 km^{2}), of which 30.6 square miles (79 km^{2}) is land and 0.7 square miles (1.8 km^{2}) (2.30%) is water.

Regionally, it is on the edge of the Merrimack Valley, Northern Middlesex County, and the Metrowest regions of Massachusetts.

Colloquially, the town is divided into different regions based on location, including Forge Village, Nabnasset, Graniteville, Parker Village, and Center of Town.

The town was rated as #11 Best Places to live by Money.com in 2013.

== Demographics ==
Historical population
Year	Pop.	±%
1790	1,229	—
1800	1,267	+3.1%
1810	1,330	+5.0%
1820	1,409	+5.9%
1830	1,327	−5.8%
1840	1,436	+8.2%
1850	1,473	+2.6%
1860	1,624	+10.3%
1870	1,803	+11.0%
1880	2,147	+19.1%
1890	2,250	+4.8%
1900	2,624	+16.6%
1910	2,851	+8.7%
1920	3,170	+11.2%
1930	3,600	+13.6%
1940	3,830	+6.4%
1950	4,262	+11.3%
1960	6,261	+46.9%
1970	10,368	+65.6%
1980	13,434	+29.6%
1990	16,467	+22.6%
2000	20,754	+26.0%
2010	21,951	+5.8%
2020	24,643	+12.3%
2024*	25,024	+1.5%
* = population estimate. Source: United States census records and Population Estimates Program data.

As of the 2010 census there were 21,951 people, 7,498 households, and 6,165 families residing in the town. The racial makeup of the town was 76.1% White, 0.40% African American, 0.1% Native American, 22.6% Asian (10.7% Indian, 8.2% Chinese, 1.6% Korean, 0.3% Cambodian, 0.2% Vietnamese, 0.2% Japanese, 0.1% Filipino, 0.1% Pakistani, 0.1% Bangladeshi), 0.0% Pacific Islander, 0.30% from other races, and 1.5% from two or more races. Hispanic or Latino of any race were 1.5% of the population.

As of the 2010 census, there were 7,498 households, out of which 45.3% had children under the age of 18 living with them, 72.5% were married couples living together, 7.3% had a female head of household, and 17.8% were other families. The average household size was 2.93 and the average family size was 3.27.

In the town, the population was spread out, with 31.8% under the age of 18, 4.2% from 18 to 24, 32.8% from 25 to 44, 23.9% from 45 to 64, and 7.2% who were 65 years of age or older. The median age was 37 years. For every 100 females, there were 99.0 males. For every 100 females age 18 and over, there were 95.4 males.

The median income for a household in the town was $121,136, and the median income for a family was $137,230. The per capita income for the town was $48,951. About 1.3% of families and 1.7% of the population were below the poverty line, including 2.2% of those under age 18 and 1.0% of those age 65 or over.

== Government ==
Voter Registration and Party Enrollment as of February 1, 2021
Party	Number of Voters	Percentage
Democratic	3,962	21.75%
Republican	1,987	10.91%
Unaffiliated	12,090	66.36%
Total	18,220	100%

== Education ==
=== Westford Public Schools ===
The Superintendent of Westford's Public Schools is Christopher Chew, who has held that role since 2021. The Assistant Superintendent is Courtney Moran.

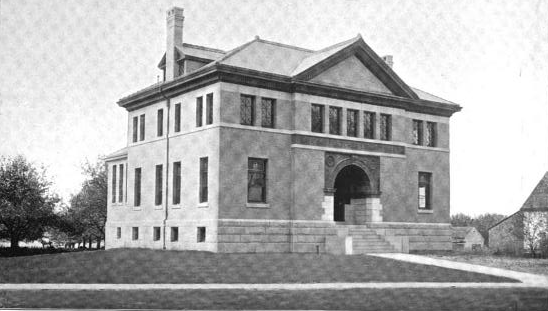
J.V. Fletcher Library, built 1895

- Westford Academy, Public High School
- Lloyd G. Blanchard Middle School, Public Middle School
- Stony Brook Middle School, Public Middle School
- Norman E. Day Elementary School, Public Elementary School (3–5)
- Abbot Elementary, Public Elementary School (3–5)
- John A. Crisafulli Elementary, Public Elementary School (3–5)
- Col. John Robinson School, Public Elementary School (K–2)
- Nabnasset Elementary School, Public Elementary School (K–2)
- Rita Edwards Miller School, Public Elementary School (K–2)

=== Nashoba Valley Technical High School District ===
Nashoba Valley Technical High School enrolls students from Westford, Chelmsford, Ayer, Groton, Littleton, Townsend, Shirley, and Pepperell

Established in 1968, Nashoba Valley Technical High School is a public, four-year, vocational high school.

- Nashoba Valley Technical High School, Public Regional Vocational Technical (known as Nashoba Tech, or The Tech)

== Transportation ==
Freight travels daily through Westford over the tracks of the historic Stony Brook Railroad. The line currently serves as a major corridor of Pan Am Railways' District 3 which connects New Hampshire and Maine with western Massachusetts, Vermont, and New York. Interstate 495 also passes through the town, linking it to other parts of the state as well as New Hampshire. US-3 passes through the town, although the nearest interchanges are located in neighboring Tyngsborough (exit 88, formerly 34) and Chelmsford (exit 86, formerly 33).

The LRTA 15 bus connects Westford along Route 110 with Chelmsford and the Lowell train station on the MBTA Commuter Rail Lowell Line.

Local routes passing through town are Massachusetts Routes 110, 40, 225, and 27.

== Notable people ==
- Joel Abbot (1793–1855), born in Westford, noted naval officer
- Pat Bradley, Member of World Golf Hall of Fame
- Michael Fucito, Retired Major League Soccer player, first drafted by the Seattle Sounders FC
- Pamela L. Gay, Astronomer
- Martha Reed Mitchell (1818–1902), philanthropist and socialite
- Ellen Henrietta Swallow Richards, creator of the field of home economics, first woman admitted to MIT, co-founder of American Association of University Women
- Lt. Col. John Robinson, Revolutionary War soldier
- Aaron Stanford, actor known for Nikita
- Nettie Stevens, American geneticist
- Lori Trahan, U.S. representative
- Willard Hall (1780–1875), U.S. Representative from Delaware and later a United States district judge; born in Westford.
- James Arciero, politician who served as a member of the Massachusetts House of Representatives from the 2nd Middlesex district.
- Geoff Hall, politician who served as a member of the Massachusetts House of Representatives from the 2nd Middlesex district and previously served as a member of the Westford Board of Selectmen.
- Barbara Peacock, documentary photographer and author known for her long-term photographic projects and published books; longtime resident of Westford.

== Points of interest ==
- Kimball Farm
- Westford Knight stone and memorial
- Nashoba Valley Ski Area
- Fairview Cemetery
- Haystack Observatory
