= Ann Fox Chandonnet =

American poet (1943–2026)

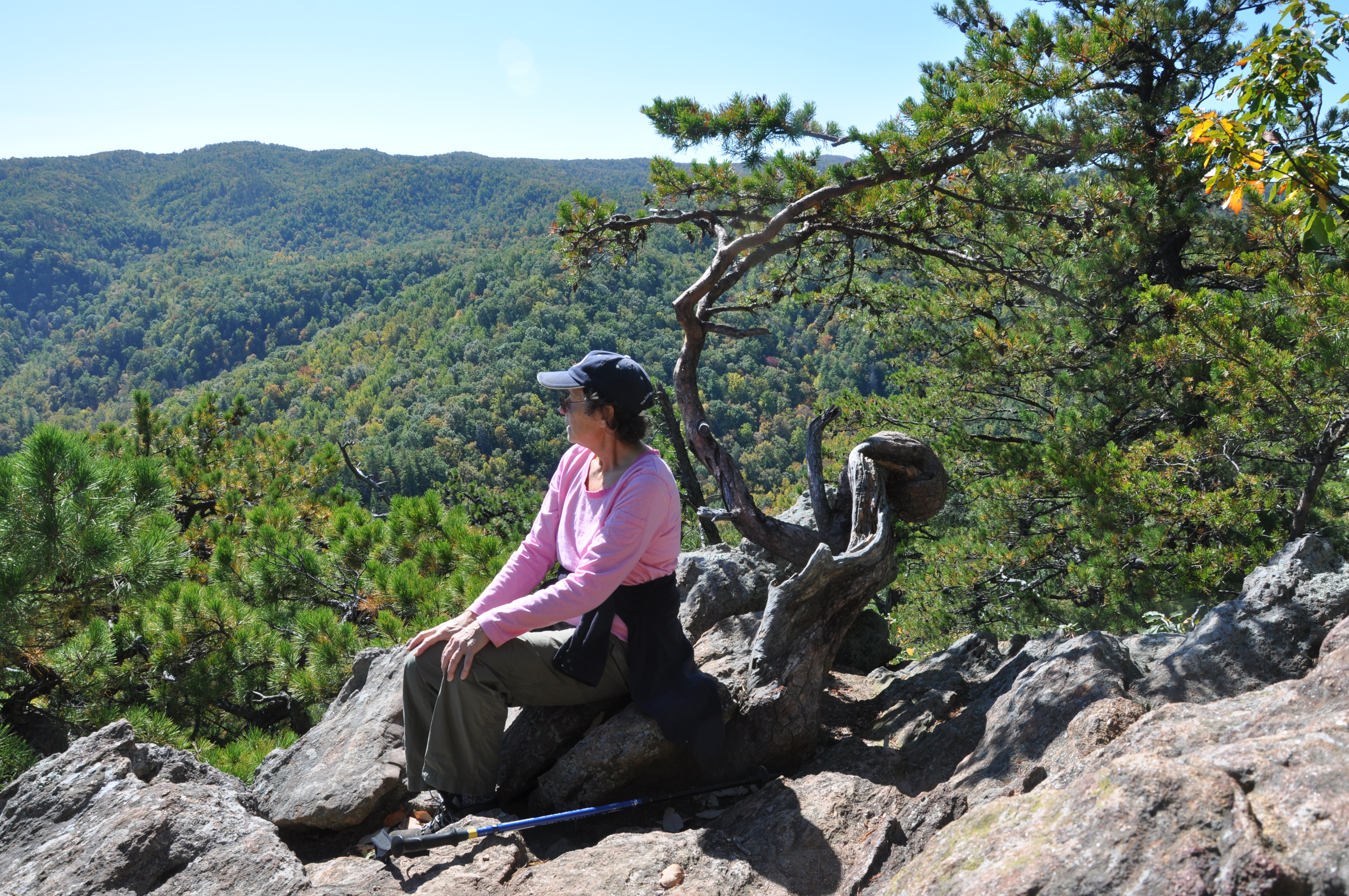
- Chandonnet at the top of the Chestnut Ridge trail in South Mountains State Park in North Carolina
- Born: Ann Alicia Fox; February 7, 1943; Lowell, Massachusetts, U.S.
- Died: May 23, 2026 (aged 83)
- Education: Dracut High School; Lowell State College (BS); University of Wisconsin–Madison (MA)
- Occupations: Poet; journalist; book reviewer; culinary historian
- Spouse: Fernand Leonce Chandonnet (m. 1966)
- Children: 2
- Parent(s): Leighton Dinsmore Fox; Barbara Amelia (Cloutman) Curran

Ann Fox Chandonnet (born Ann Alicia Fox; February 7, 1943 – May 23, 2026) was an American poet, journalist, book reviewer and culinary historian.

== Life and career ==
Ann Alicia Fox was born in Lowell, Massachusetts, on February 7, 1943 to Leighton Dinsmore Fox and Barbara Amelia (Cloutman) Curran. She grew up on a dairy farm in Dracut, Massachusetts and she graduated from Dracut High School, magna cum laude from Lowell State College in 1964 with a B.S. in Secondary Education and from the University of Wisconsin-Madison in 1965 with an M.A. in English Literature. She married Fernand “Fern” Leonce Chandonnet in 1966 and they have two sons, Yves and Alexandre. She has lived in Chugiak, Alaska, Anchorage, Alaska, Vale, North Carolina, and O'Fallon, Missouri.

Her poems have appeared in anthologies and various magazines, including Permafrost, Ice Floe, Abraxas, New Kauri, MidAtlantic and Calapooya Collage. Her articles on food history have appeared in Early American Life magazine. She also had a food column in Alaska magazine.

Chandonnet worked as a reporter for the now-defunct the Anchorage Times newspaper from 1982 to 1992 and the Juneau Empire from 1999 to 2002. She taught English at Kodiak High School in Alaska from 1965 to 1966 and also taught at Lowell State College in Massachusetts from 1966 to 1969. For five years she was a publicist for a small publishing office in Anchorage.

From the cover to her book "Colonial Food": "Ann Chandonnet is a food historian, poet and journalist. She is a member of the Culinary Historians of Washington, D.C., and is the author of the award-winning "Gold Rush Grub" and "The Pioneer Village Cookbook." Chandonnet started cooking when she was 11 or 12 years old and was making meals for the family. In high school, she entered her jams and canned foods to the state fair.

Chandonnet died on May 23, 2026, at the age of 83.

== Selected works ==
- "On a Human Scale", Ploughshares, Spring 1979
- "In Velvet," Kalliope: A Journal of Woman's Literature and Art, Vol. 2, No. 2, Winter 1980.
- "Avalanche", Alaska Quarterly Review, Vol. 24, No. 1 & 2, Spring/Summer 2007
- Jam for the Lamb, Wild Goose Poetry Review, Summer 2008
- "Sacraments in Simple Things", Wild Goose Poetry Review, Summer 2009
- "Driving Black", Wild Goose Poetry Review, Fall 2011
- "My Mother’s Poems & My Father’s Poems", Wild Goose Poetry Review, Winter 2011
- "Saturday Night and Sunday Morning", Wild Goose Poetry Review, Fall 2012
- "Sapphic", The Dead Mule School, December 2012

Poetry

- The Wife. Chugiak, Alaska: Chandonnet. 1979.
- The Wife: Part 2. Chicago, Ill.: Adams Press. 1979.
- At the Fruit-Tree's Mossy Root: The Marsh Hill Idylls. Wings Press. 1980.
- Ptarmigan Valley: Poems of Alaska. Boulder, CO: Lightning Tree Press. 1980. ISBN 978-0-89016-053-4.
- Auras, Tendrils. Moonbeam, Ont.: Penumbra Press. 1984. ISBN 0-920806-45-7.
- Canoeing in the Rain: Poems for My Aleut-Athabascan Son. Forest Grove, Or.: Meredith Bliss. 1990. ISBN 978-0-9622738-2-7.

Fiction

- Chief Stephen's Parky : One Year in the Life of an Athapascan Girl. Niwot, Colo.: Roberts Rinehart. 1993. ISBN 9781879373396.
- The Birthday Party. McRoy & Blackburn Pub. 1995. ISBN 978-0963259639.

Non-fiction

- The Complete Fruit Cookbook. Ringwood, Vic.: Penguin Books Australia. 1972. ISBN 9780140700534.
- The Cheese Guide & Cookbook : featuring recipes from the world's great cuisines and a glossary of cheeses and cheese terms. [Concord, Calif.]: [Nitty Gritty Productions]. 1973.
- Alaska Heritage Seafood Cookbook. Anchorage: Graphic Arts Center. 1995. ISBN 978-0-88240-469-1.
- Alaska's Arts, Crafts & Collectibles. Anchorage, AK: Chandonnet Editing & Research. 1998. ISBN 0-9662999-0-6.
- Anchorage, early photographs of the Great Land. Whitehorse, Yukon: Wolf Creek Books. 2000. ISBN 9780968195567.
- A History of Alaskan Totem Poles. Camarillo, CA: John Hinde Curteich, Inc. 2003.
- Gold Rush Grub: From Turpentine Stew to Hoochinoo. Fairbanks: University of Alaska Press. 2005. ISBN 978-1-889963-71-6.
- Alaska's Inside Passage. New York: Compass American Guides. 2009. ISBN 9781400009022.
- "Write Quick": War and a Woman's Life in Letters, 1835-1867. Bethel, Maine: Winoca Press. 2010. ISBN 978-0-9789736-9-8.
- Colonial Food. Oxford: Shire Publications Ltd. 2013. ISBN 9780747812401.

Anthologies

- Patricia Monaghan, ed. (1983). Hunger and dreams : the Alaskan women's anthology. Fairbanks, Alaska: Fireweed Press. ISBN 9780914221005.
- Robert Hedin, ed. (May 1984). In the Dreamlight: 21 Alaskan Writers. Port Townsend, WA: Copper Canyon Press. ISBN 978-0-914742-76-0.
- Kathleen Aponick, ed. (January 1992). Merrimack: A Poetry Anthology. Lowell, Mass.: Loom Press. ISBN 978-0-931507-05-2.
- Fine China: Twenty Years of Earth's Daughters. Springhouse Editions; First edition. 1993. ISBN 978-1877800047.
- Wayne Mergler, ed. (October 1, 1996). The Last New Land: Stories of Alaska, Past and Present. Anchorage: Alaska Northwest Books. ISBN 978-0-88240-483-7.
- Anne Hanley, ed. (2005). Alaska Reader: Voices from the North. Fulcrum Publishing. ISBN 9781555915551.
- Vicky Lettmann; Carol Roan, eds. (2011). When Last on the Mountain: The View from Writers over 50. Holy Cow! Press. ISBN 9780982354520.
