= Dunstable Center Historic District =

Historic district in Massachusetts, United States

- U.S. National Register of Historic Places
- U.S. Historic district
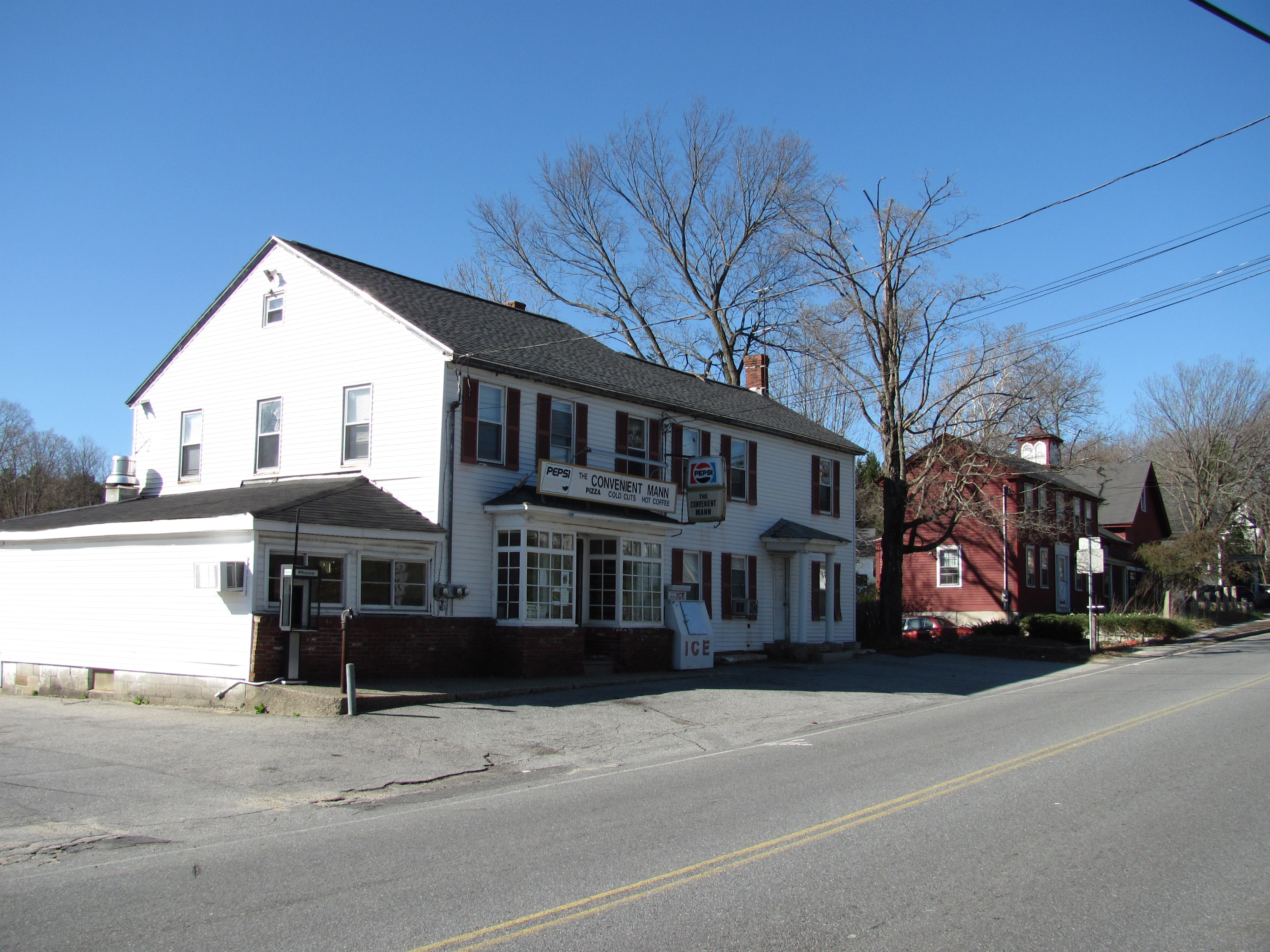
- Pleasant Street

- Location within Massachusetts Location within the United States
- Location: High, Highland, Main, & Pleasant Sts., Dunstable, Massachusetts
- Coordinates: 42°40′28″N 71°28′56″W
- Area: 150 acres (61 ha)
- NRHP reference No.: 100003069
- Added to NRHP: November 5, 2018

The Dunstable Center Historic District encompasses the town center of Dunstable, Massachusetts. Centered at the junction Main, High, and Pleasant Streets, this area has served as the town center since 1791, when its church was moved here. The district, now home to a broad array of residential and civic architecture, was listed on the National Register of Historic Places in 2002.

== Description and history ==
The town of Dunstable was incorporated in 1673, and originally covered a large area, from Milford, New Hampshire to Tyngsborough, Massachusetts. Early growth was slow, and the community remained predominantly agricultural into the mid-20th century. The town's boundaries were altered by splitting off neighboring towns (most recently Tyngsborough, Massachusetts in 1809) and the setting of the border between Massachusetts and New Hampshire in 1740. In 1753, the town's citizenry voted to build a new church on Meeting House Hill, about 1 mile (1.6 km) east of the current town center. That building was moved in 1791, prompted by a population shift in the rural community into western portions, and a schoolhouse was also built on the same parcel. Neither of these buildings survive, but the present Evangelical Church, a neo-Classical building dating to 1913, was built on the site, and an 1825 schoolhouse, converted for public works use, stands nearby.

The district is centered at the four-way junction of Main, High, and Pleasant Streets, and is about 150 acres (61 ha) in size. In addition to the church, civic buildings include Roby Memorial Hall, built in 1908 and serving as town hall, and the Classical Revival Union School, built in 1895. Three 18th-century houses survive from the center's early days, as does the 1754 cemetery, laid out to replace one located on Meeting House Hill.

== See also ==
- National Register of Historic Places listings in Middlesex County, Massachusetts
