= Vincent Chin =

Vincent Chin may refer to:

- Vincent "Randy" Chin (1937–2003), Jamaican record producer and label owner
- Vincent Jen Chin (1955–1982), Chinese American victim of a racially motivated killing
- Vincent Chin, a victim in the 1993 Ramada Hotel drownings
- Vincent Gigante (1928–2005), American mobster nicknamed "The Chin"
