= Patrick Murphy (American football) =

American football player and coach (born c. 1971)

Current position
- Title: Special teams coordinator & tight ends coach
- Team: Brown
- Conference: Ivy League

Biographical details
- Born: c. 1972 (age 53–54)

Playing career
- 1992–1995: Northeastern
- Positions: Fullback, tight end, linebacker

Coaching career (HC unless noted)
- 1996–1997: UMass Lowell (GA)
- 1998–2000: UMass Lowell (DC)
- 2001: Bryant (OLB)
- 2001–2002: Ayer Shirley Regional HS (MA) (DC)
- 2003: Harvard (DE)
- 2004–2007: Dracut HS (MA)
- 2008–2015: Saint Anselm
- 2016–2017: Tufts (RB)
- 2018: Georgetown (OC/QB)
- 2018–2019: Holy Cross (OC/QB)
- 2020–2024: Rhode Island (OC/QB)
- 2025–present: Brown (ST/TE)

Head coaching record
- Overall: 19–65 (college); 27–17 (high school)

Accomplishments and honors

Awards
- D2football.com Northeast-10 Coach of the Year (2008); NE-10 co-Coach of the Year (2014)

Patrick Murphy (born c. 1972) is an American college football coach. He is the special teams coordinator and tight ends coach for Brown University, positions he has held since 2025. He was the head football coach for Dracut High School from 2004 to 2007 and for Saint Anselm College from 2008 to 2015. He previously coached for UMass Lowell, Bryant, Ayer Shirley Regional High School, Harvard, Tufts, Georgetown, Holy Cross, and Rhode Island. He played college football for Northeastern as a fullback, tight end, and linebacker.

== Head coaching record ==
=== College ===
Year	Team	Overall	Conference	Standing	Bowl/playoffs
Saint Anselm Hawks (Northeast-10 Conference) (2008–2015)
2008	Saint Anselm	2–8	1–6	T–7th	
2009	Saint Anselm	2–8	1–7	T–8th	
2010	Saint Anselm	2–8	2–6	8th	
2011	Saint Anselm	1–9	1–7	8th	
2012	Saint Anselm	2–9	1–7	8th	
2013	Saint Anselm	1–10	1–8	9th	
2014	Saint Anselm	6–5	5–4	5th	
2015	Saint Anselm	3–8	2–7	9th	
Saint Anselm:		19–65	14–52		
Total:		19–65			

=== High school ===
Year	Team	Overall	Conference	Standing	Bowl/playoffs
Dracut Middies () (2004–2007)
2004	Dracut	4–7	2–6	8th	
2005	Dracut	8–3	5–3	4th	
2006	Dracut	9–2	6–2	3rd	
2007	Dracut	6–5	4–4	6th	
Dracut:		27–17	17–15		
Total:		27–17			
