= LRTA =

LRTA may refer to:

- Light Rail Transit Association, a light rail transit advocacy group based in the United Kingdom
- Light Rail Transit Authority, a transit operator in Manila, Philippines
- Lowell Regional Transit Authority, a transit operator in Lowell, Massachusetts, United States
