= Greater Lowell =

- Region of Massachusetts
- Red represents the City of Lowell; dark blue represents the Greater Lowell area; light blue represents the New England city and town area Division Lowell-Billerica-Chelmsford; purple represents both.
- Interactive map of Greater Lowell
- Coordinates: 42°40′00″N 71°20′00″W
- Country: United States
- State: Massachusetts
- Towns and cities: Billerica, Chelmsford, Dracut, Dunstable, Groton, Lowell, Pepperell, Tewksbury, Tyngsborough, Westford
- Largest city: Lowell, Massachusetts (108,522) (2010 census)

Population (2010 census)
  - Total: 299,550

Greater Lowell is the region comprising the city of Lowell, Massachusetts, United States, and its suburbs. These lie in northern Middlesex County, Massachusetts; in the Merrimack Valley; and in southern New Hampshire.

== Towns ==
The Greater Lowell area as defined as the Lowell Metropolitan area consists of the towns of Billerica, Chelmsford, Dracut, Dunstable, Groton, Lowell, Pepperell, Tewksbury, Tyngsborough, and Westford. The town of Pelham, New Hampshire, may also be included in Greater Lowell.

The New England city and town area Division Lowell–Billerica–Chelmsford contains some towns that can be considered part of Greater Lowell: in Massachusetts, these are Ashby, Ayer, Billerica, Chelmsford, Dracut, Groton, Harvard, Littleton, Lowell, Shirley, Tewksbury, Townsend, Tyngsborough, and Westford; in New Hampshire, the town of Pelham.

== Demographics ==
The towns of Greater Lowell in Massachusetts have a combined population of 299,550 based on the 2010 census. Including the town of Pelham, Greater Lowell has 312,447 inhabitants.

== Culture and education ==
The city of Lowell is a cultural and institutional center for the region. It is home to the Tsongas Center at UMass Lowell and the Lowell National Historical Park, which preserves the region's legacy as an early textile manufacturing center during the Industrial Revolution.

The University of Massachusetts Lowell and a campus of Middlesex Community College are located in the city, as are Lowell General Hospital and Saints Medical Center, the regional hospitals. Greater Lowell Technical High School serves many of the towns in the region.

Lowell is home to the Superior and District Court for Northern Middlesex County and is technically a county seat, although Massachusetts counties are largely historical in function. Culturally, many residents of Greater Lowell have deep roots in the city itself, tend to be more blue collar, and speak with an urban Boston accent. Greater Lowell is split politically while the region as a whole is more likely to vote for a conservative candidate than other parts of the state whereas the city of Lowell is more likely to vote liberally.

== Economy ==
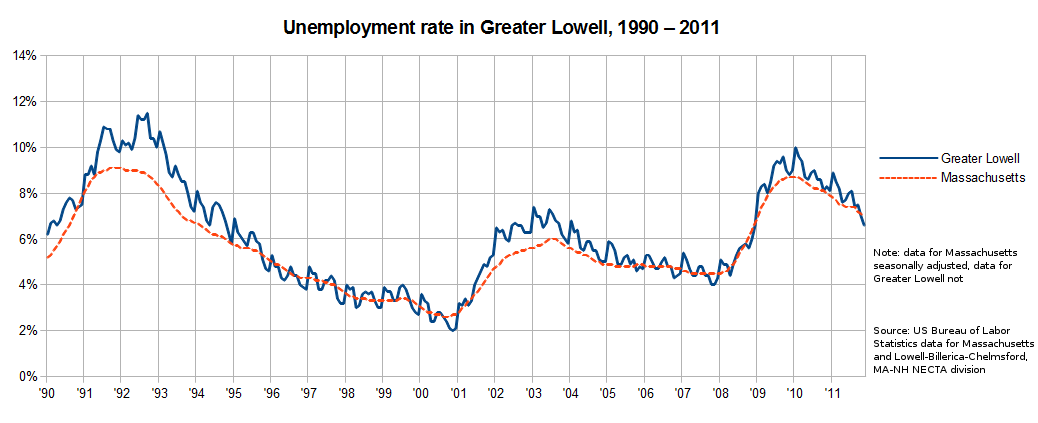
Unemployment rate of Greater Lowell (blue) compared to that of Massachusetts (red) from 1990 through 2011. Note that the data for Massachusetts is seasonally adjusted, while that for Greater Lowell is not; that is why the former line is smoother than the latter.

Employment by sector in Greater Lowell in 2010

The economy of Greater Lowell is closely tied to that of Greater Boston. Outside of the services, health, and retail sectors, major employers are in high technology and defense, with a still-shrinking manufacturing sector.

Suburban sprawl and serious economic hardships have reduced the role Lowell plays in its suburbs over the decades. The entire region is often considered a component of the much larger Greater Boston area, as Lowell is only 25 miles from downtown Boston. Suburban office parks, shopping malls, and the severe decline of heavy industry in New England have pulled the economic focus away from the once great industrial and commercial base in Lowell itself. The population of Lowell is at 1900 levels despite large growth among the suburban population.
