= Blanchard Hill (Massachusetts) =

Hill in Middlesex County, Massachusetts, United States

Highest point
- Elevation: 367 ft (112 m)
- Coordinates: 42.6959227°N 71.5028440°W

Geography
- Location: Dunstable , Massachusetts, U.S.

Climbing
- Easiest route: Trail

Blanchard Hill is a hill located 1.7 miles from the center of Dunstable, Massachusetts.

== History ==
From the years 1959 to 1988, Blanchard Hill was used as the location for a ski resort. The Blanchard Hill Ski Area initially featured a single ski tow and an open slope, but was later expanded to include three ski tows, three action slopes, a T-bar lift and three slopes as well as a ski lodge. The area was eventually closed and sold off in 1988, to be divided up into a housing development on Sky Top Lane and a conservation area which includes 39.38 acres of land.
