= Lowell Regional Transit Authority =

Massachusetts, US non-profit public transportation organization

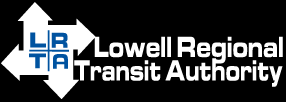

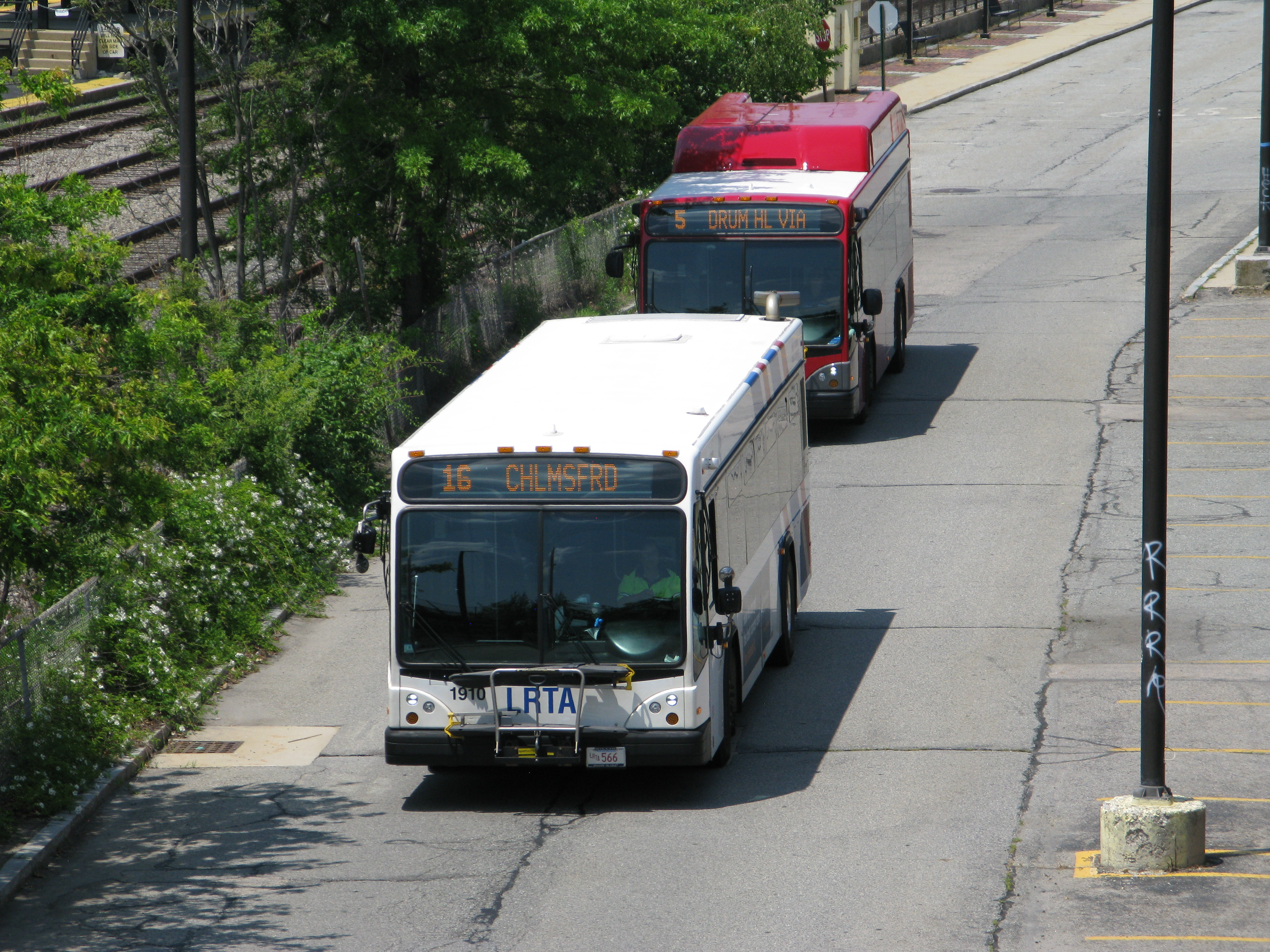
- LRTA buses leaving the Robert B. Kennedy Bus Transfer Center in 2026
- Founded: 1974
- Headquarters: 145 Thorndike Street
- Locale: Lowell, Massachusetts
- Service area: Greater Lowell
- Service type: Bus service, paratransit
- Routes: 21
- Destinations: Andover, Lowell, Chelmsford, Billerica, Tewksbury, Wilmington, Burlington, Dracut, Tyngsborough, Westford, Littleton
- Fuel type: Diesel, hybrid
- Operator: First Transit
- Administrator: David Bradley
- Website: lrta.com

The Lowell Regional Transit Authority (LRTA) is a public, non-profit organization in Massachusetts, charged with providing public transportation to the Greater Lowell area. This primarily includes the city of Lowell and the towns of Andover, Billerica, Burlington, Dracut, Chelmsford, Littleton, Tewksbury, Tyngsborough, Westford and Wilmington. The LRTA provides fixed route bus services and paratransit services within this area, although some fixed lines do extend beyond these towns.

The LRTA was created in September 1974 under Chapter 161B of the Massachusetts General Laws, the law that impacts all transit authorities in the state of Massachusetts. Since 2004, operation of the LRTA has been subcontracted to First Transit, a subsidiary of the United Kingdom based FirstGroup.

The area served by the LRTA is within the commuter rail service area of the Massachusetts Bay Transportation Authority (MBTA). At the Gallagher Transit Terminal in Lowell, LRTA buses provide connection to each other, to trains on MBTA's Lowell Line, and to various intercity bus routes.

== Routes ==
As of July 2026, the LRTA operates 21 bus routes. All terminate at the Gallagher Terminal in Lowell except for route 21, which operates only in Burlington and Wilmington, Massachusetts.

- Route 1: Christian Hill
- Route 2: Belvidere
- Route 3: South Lowell
- Route 4: Highlands via Stevens
- Route 5: Westford Street/Drum Hill
- Route 6: Broadway/UMass Lowell South
- Route 7: Pawtucketville/UMass Lowell North
- Route 8: Centralville
- Route 9: Lowell Circulator
- Route 10: Dracut/Tyngsboro
- Route 11: IRS/Raytheon via Rte. 133
- Route 12: Tewksbury via Rte. 38 / Wilmington Train Station
- Route 13: Billerica via Edson
- Route 14: Burlington Mall/Lahey Clinic
- Route 15: Chelmsford/Westford via Rte. 129/110
- Route 16: Chelmsford via Chelmsford Street
- Route 17: North Chelmsford via Middlesex Street
- Route 18: Downtown Shuttle
- Route 19: Nashua Connection
- Route 20: Orange Line / UMass Lowell North
- Route 21: Wilmington Train Station / Burlington Mall Shuttle

== Fleet ==
The LRTA owns a fleet of 108 revenue-producing vehicles, which includes 57 Gillig Low Floor buses for scheduled route service and 49 Ford Transit and 2 Ford E450 minibuses for paratransit service.

== Gallery ==
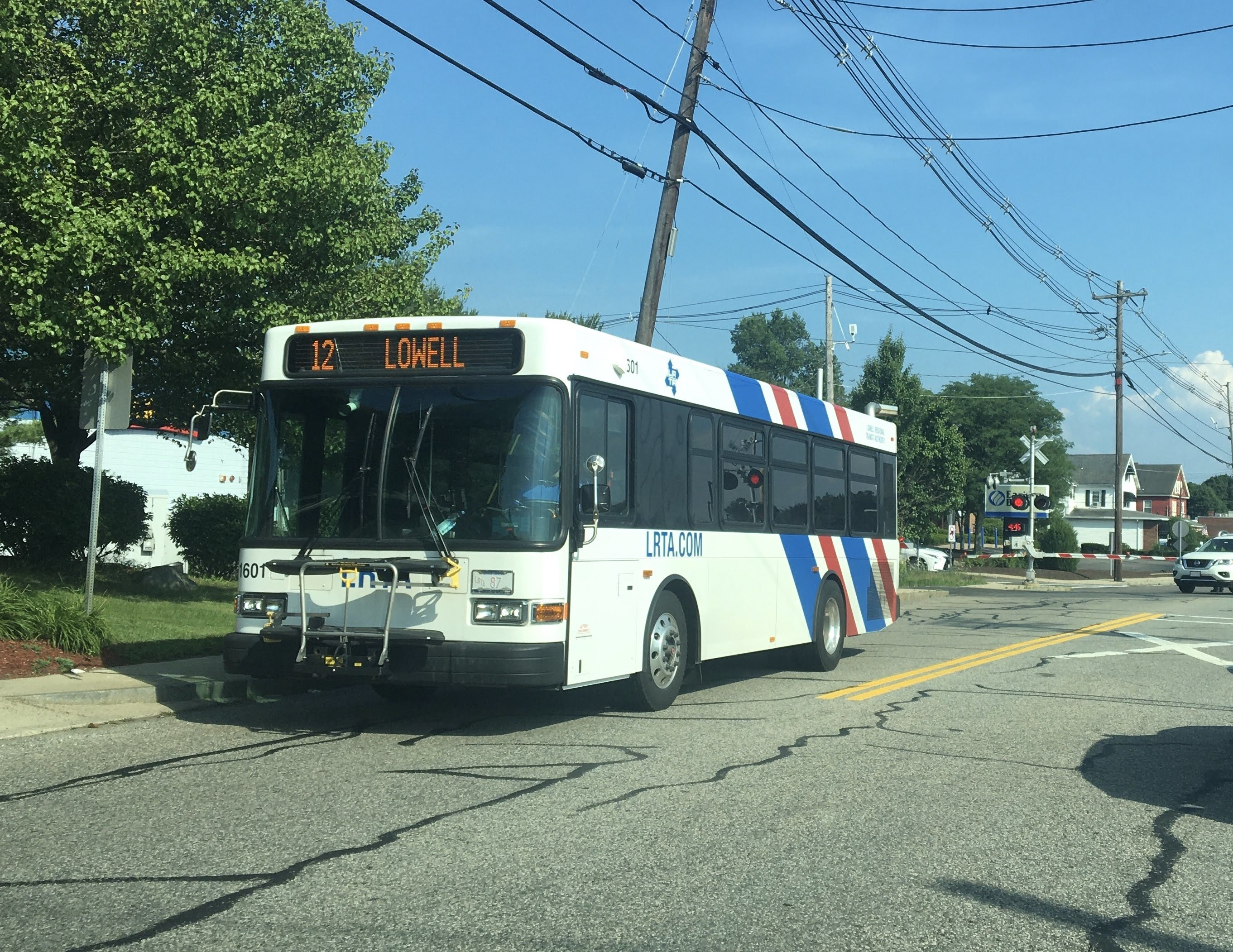
An LRTA route 12 bus in Wilmington

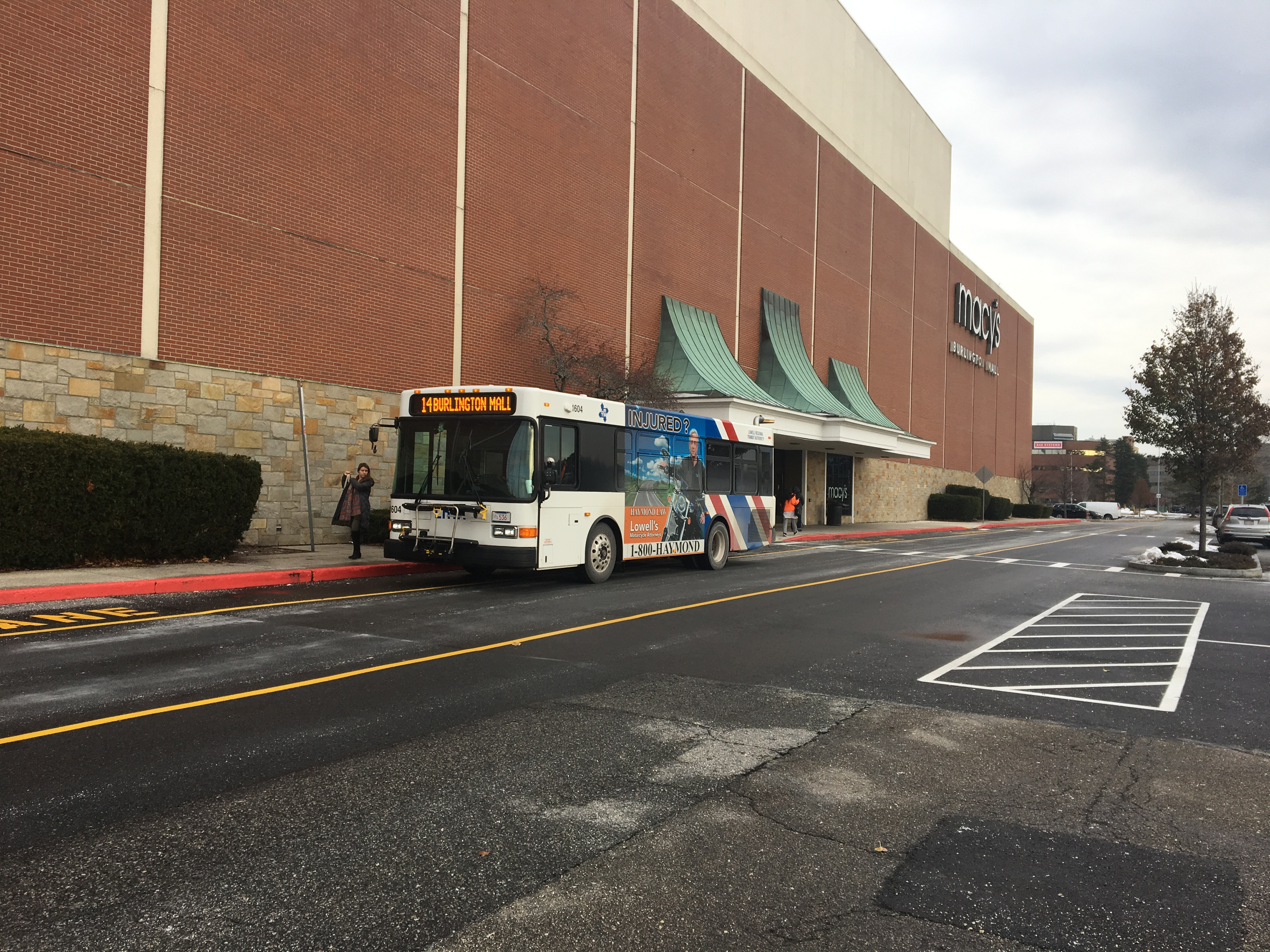
LRTA route 14 bus at Burlington Mall

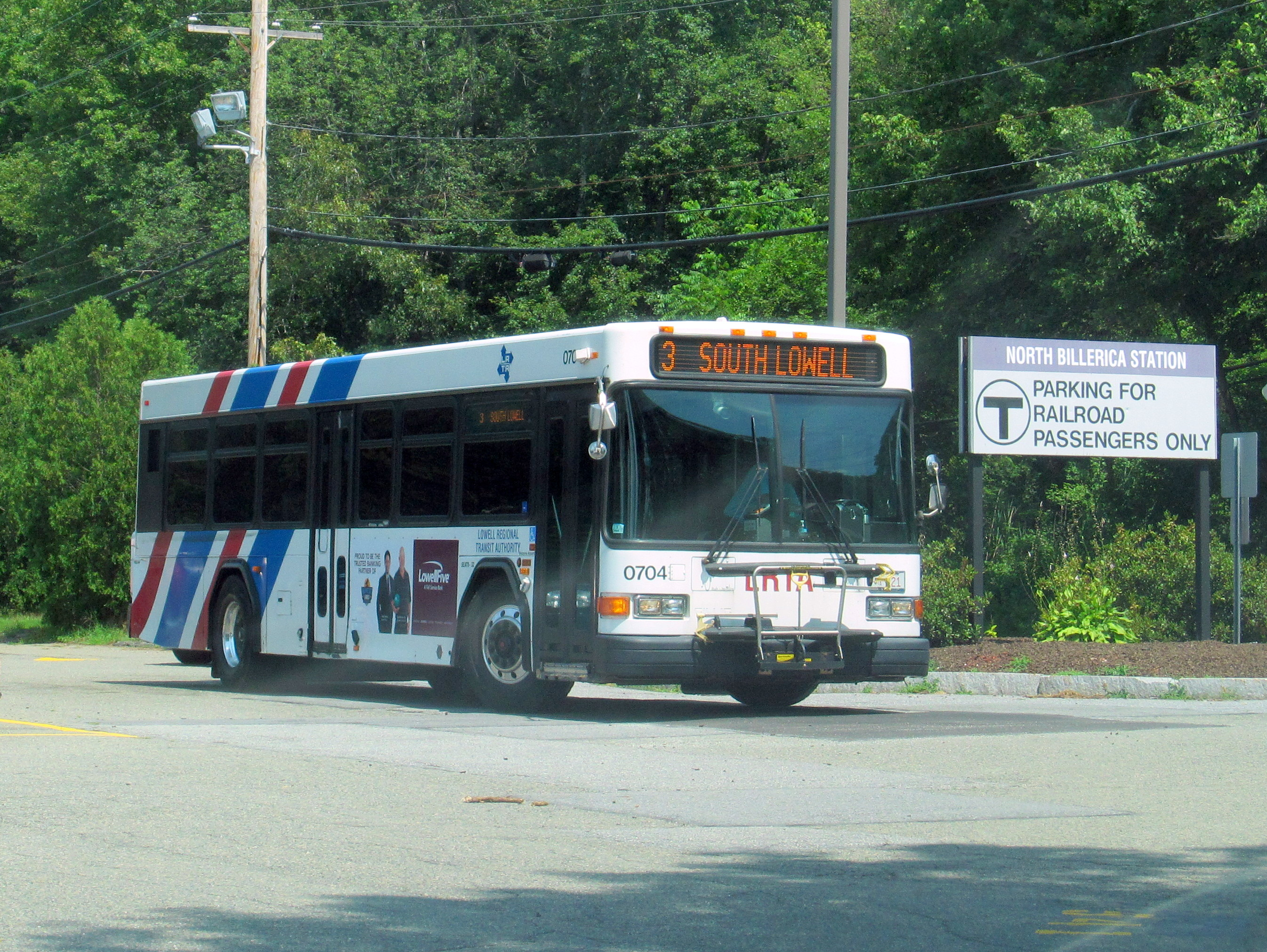
LRTA route 3 bus at North Billerica station in 2015

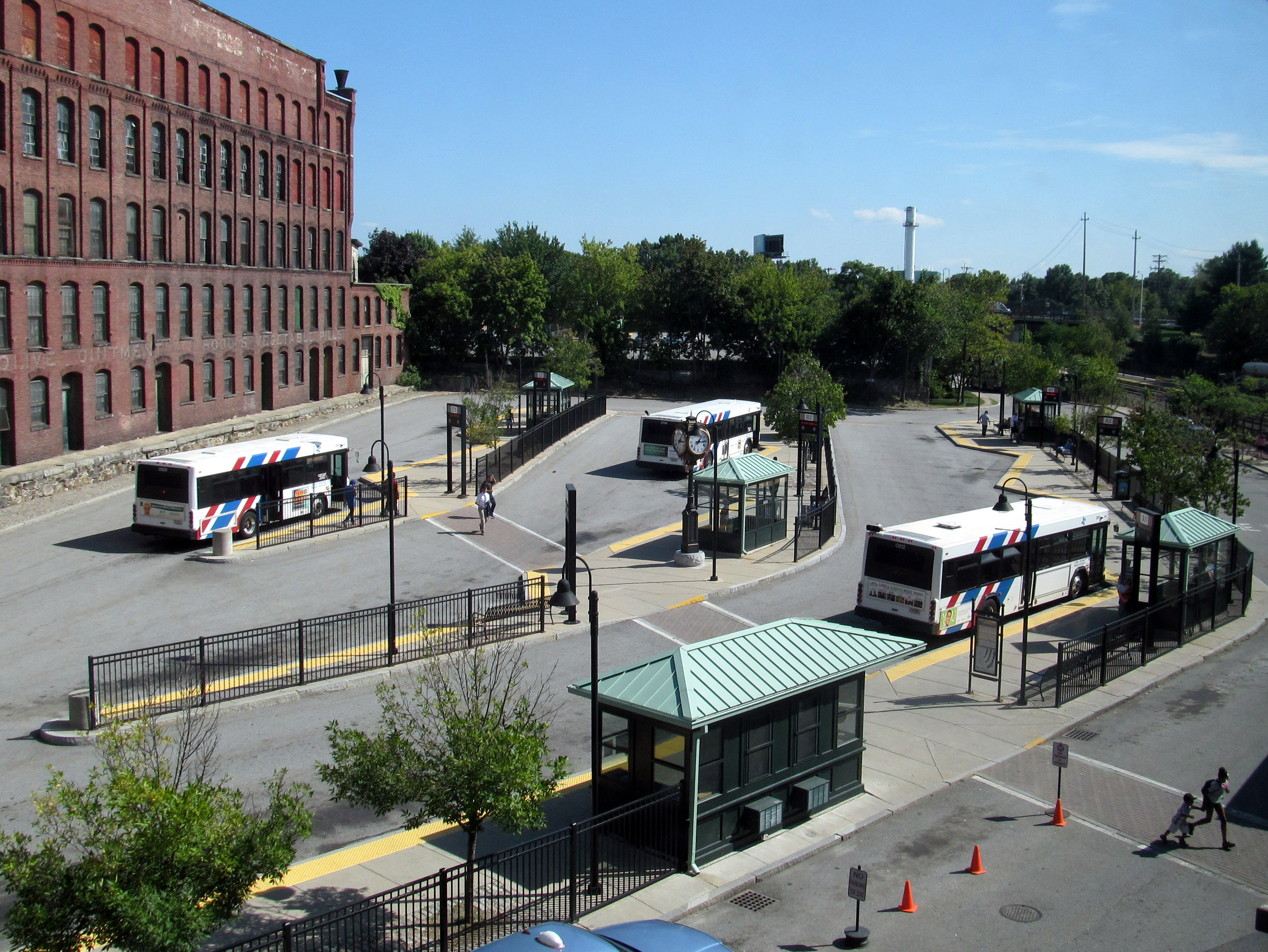
Three LRTA buses stopped at the Robert B. Kennedy Bus Terminal

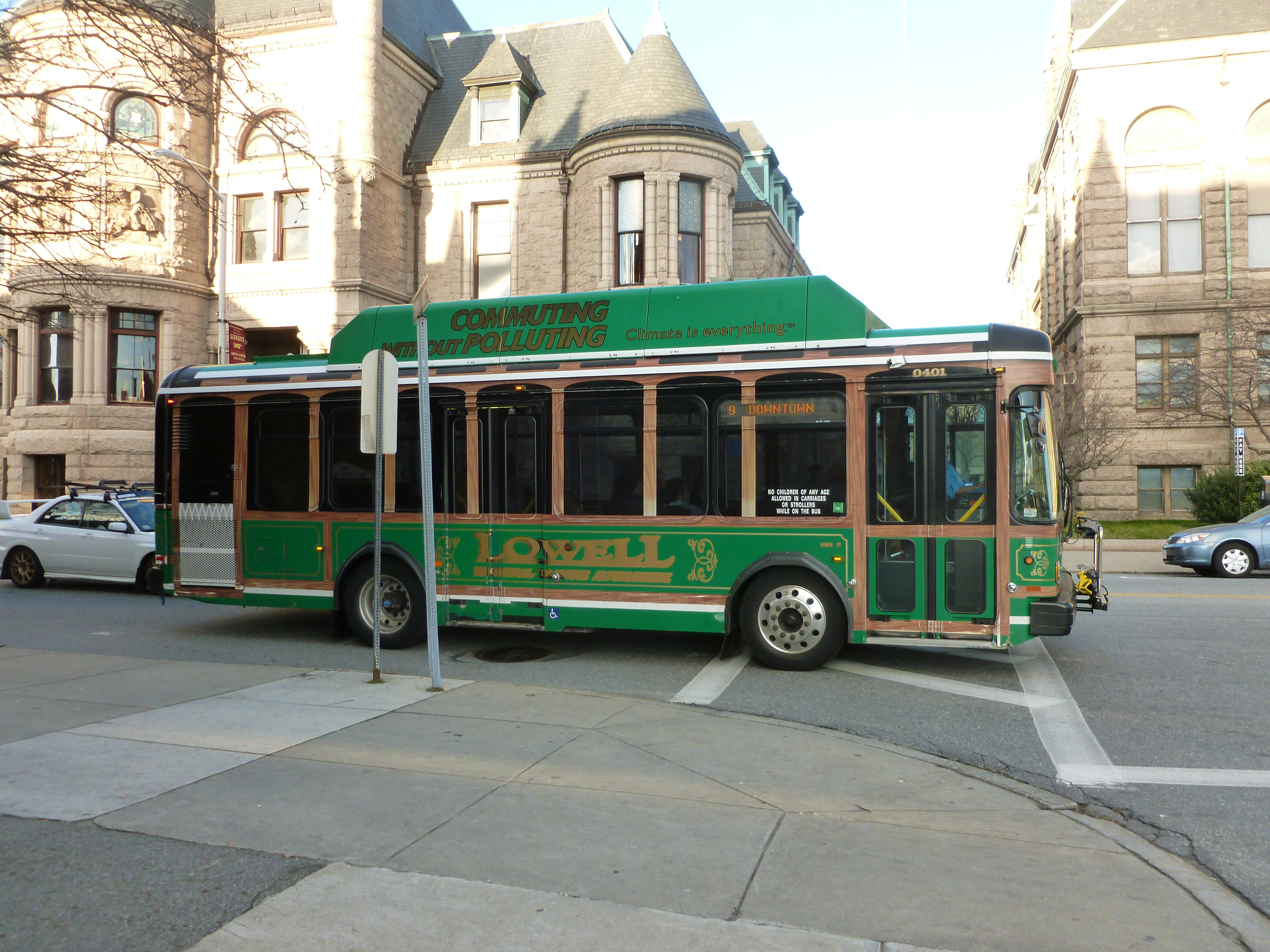
An LRTA trolley-replica bus on route 9

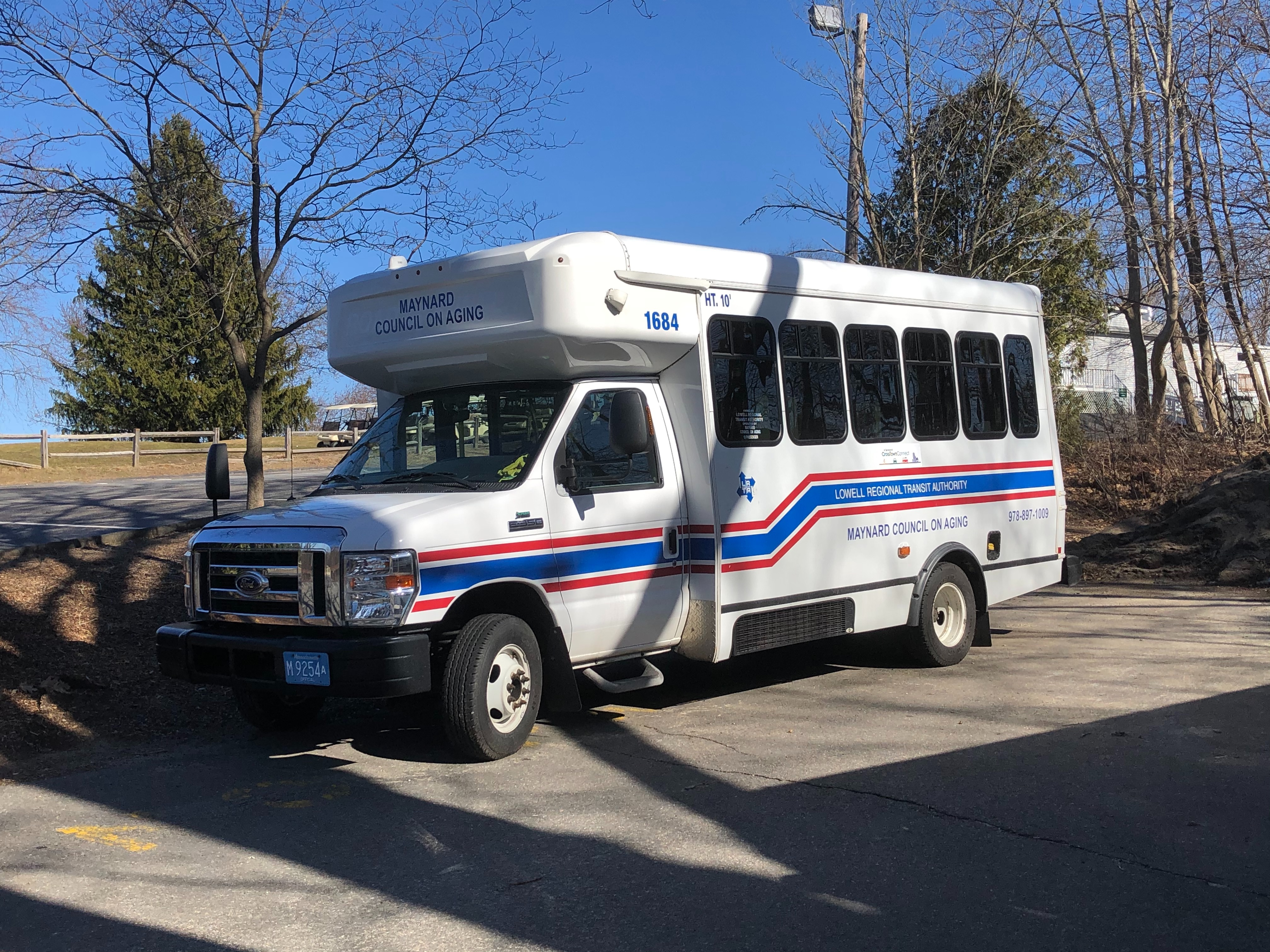
An LRTA minibus in Maynard, Massachusetts
