= Lowell General Hospital =

Coordinates: 42°38′51″N 71°20′30″W

- Tufts Medicine

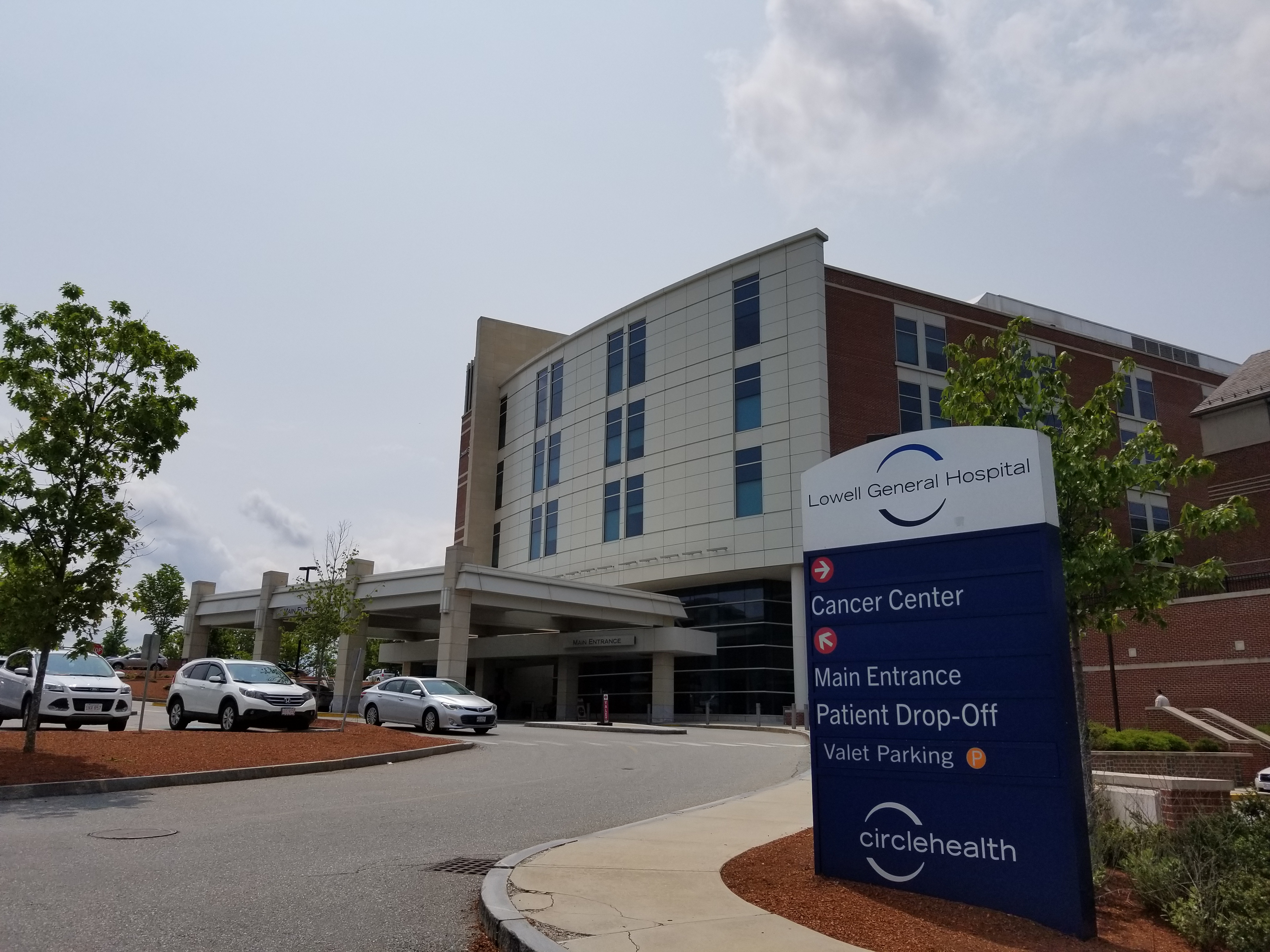

Geography
- Location: 295 Varnum Ave. Lowell, Massachusetts 01852

Organisation
- Care system: Private, Medicare, Medicaid
- Type: Community Hospital

Services
- Emergency department: Level III trauma center
- Beds: 445

Helipads
- Helipad: (FAA LID: 40MA)
Number	Length		Surface
Number	ft	m	Surface
H1	44	13	Concrete

History
- Founded: 1891

Links
- Website: https://www.tuftsmedicine.org/get-care/locations/lowell-general-hospital

Founded in 1891, Lowell General Hospital is an independent, not-for-profit community hospital serving the Greater Lowell area and surrounding communities. With two primary campuses located in Lowell, Massachusetts, Lowell General Hospital offers a full range of medical and surgical services for patients. Lowell General Hospital is a member of the Voluntary Hospitals of America. Lowell General is affiliated with Tufts Medicine in Boston.

== History ==
The Lowell Free Hospital Association was founded in May 1891. James Fellows funded the purchase of the Fay mansion in the Pawtucketville neighborhood with a $30,000 donation, and in July 1893, Lowell General Hospital opened. In the first year, the Lowell General Hospital Training School for Nurses started.

LGH Nurses responded to the Spanish Influenza outbreak, which struck Lowell particularly hard, in November 1918. The epidemic killed several hundred people in the city.

In the twentieth century, the hospital underwent several expansions, with a building dedicated to the Nursing School, and a Maternity and Children's Building.

In 2012, Lowell General merged with Saints Medical Center, adding a second campus to the hospital, and consolidating hospital care in the city under the Lowell General Hospital name. The hospital, now one of the largest institutions in the Merrimack Valley, has 407 beds. Saints Medical Center itself has a long history in Lowell, itself formed by the 1992 merger of St. Joseph's Hospital and St. John's Hospital. St. Joseph's Hospital, the oldest in the city, had been founded as Lowell Corporation Hospital in 1839.

== Magnet designation ==
The Magnet Recognition Program recognizes healthcare organizations that are dedicated to nursing excellence, professionalism and patient focused care. The American Nurses Credentialing Center (ANCC), the largest and most prominent nursing credentialing organization in the United States, honored Lowell General Hospital with Magnet Recognition for excellence in nursing care in October 2010. Lowell General was the eighth hospital in Massachusetts to achieve Magnet designation.

== Criticism ==
The hospital received criticism for the salary paid to its previous president, Joseph White, being $1.25 million, while hospital staff have not received increases in their compensation. According to ProPublica, in 2019 there were 12 employees being paid more than $200,000 per year:

In 2019 Joseph White (President) was paid $1,324,761 Amy Hoey (Chief Operating Officer): $759,458 William Galvin III (Board Member/Medical Director):$523,540 Cecelia Lynch (CNO): $409,111 Arthur Lauretano (CMO): $400,926 William Wyman (VP of finance): $366,595 Wendy Mitchell (Medical Director): $312,213 Ramya Prabhakar (Physician): $272,947 James Woolman (Director ACO Performance Management): $261,532 Emily Young (Director of Healthcare Operations): $261,055 Yishis Ren (Chief Medical Physicist): $252,271 Michelle Davis (VP External Affairs): $233,198
