= Tyngsborough Bridge =

Steel tied-arch bridge in Tyngsborough, Massachusetts

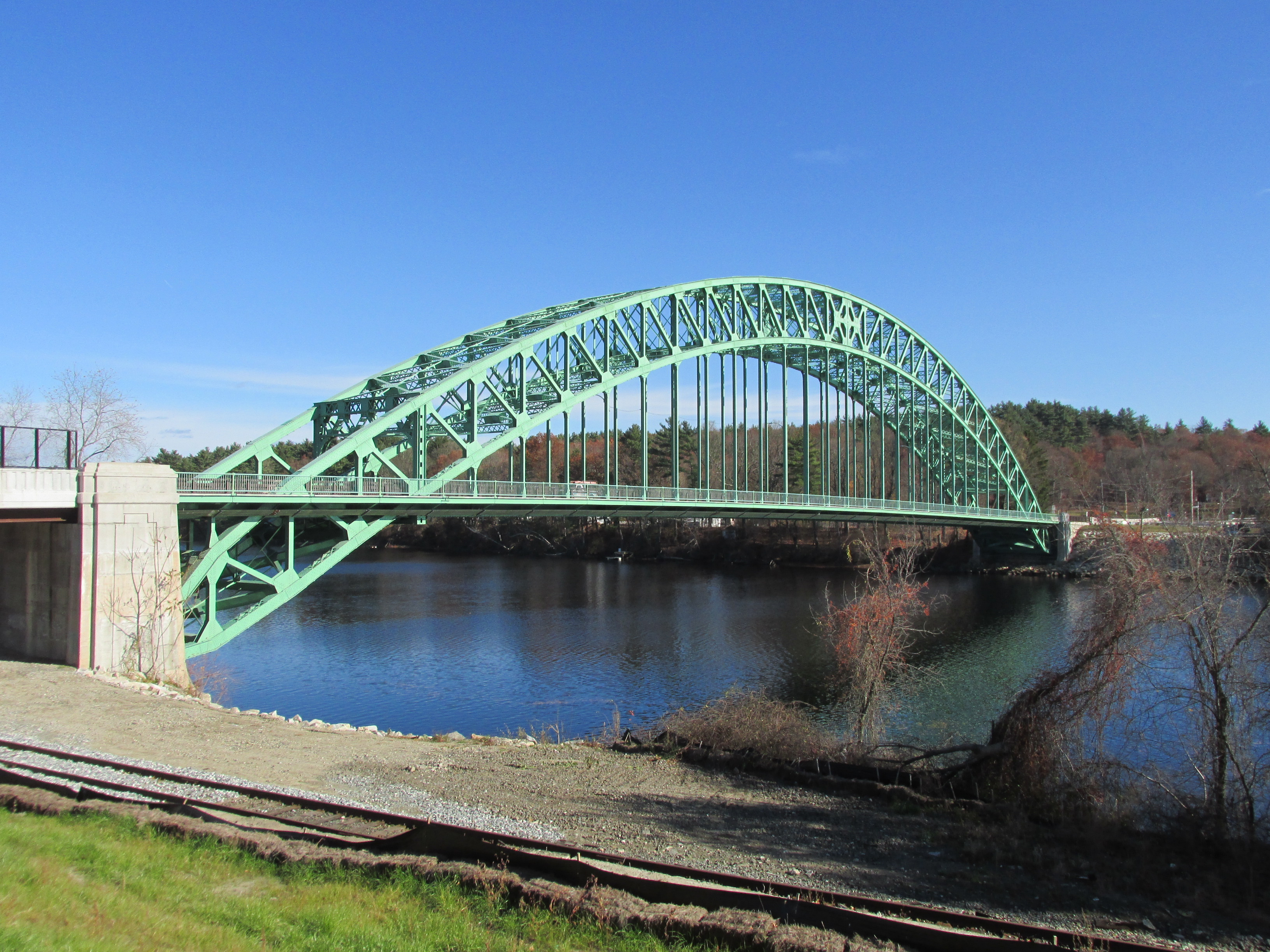
- Tyngsborough Bridge in 2013
- Coordinates: 42.67605°N 71.42133°W
- Crosses: Merrimack River
- Locale: Tyngsborough, Massachusetts
- Official name: Tyngsborough Bridge
- Owner: Massachusetts Department of Transportation
- Preceded by: Whipple Truss Bridge

Characteristics
- Design: Tied-arch bridge
- Material: Steel
- Total length: 656 feet (200 m)
- Width: 41.5 feet (12.6 m)
- Longest span: 547 feet (167 m)
- No. of spans: 1
- Piers in water: 0
- Load limit: M 18

History
- Designer: MassHighway in-house Design Unit
- Constructed by: Simpson Bros. Corporation; Boston Bridge Works
- Opened: 1930
- Rebuilt: 1975

Statistics
- Daily traffic: 22,300 (2007)

Location
- Interactive map of Tyngsborough Bridge

The Tyngsborough Bridge is a steel tied-arch bridge located in Tyngsborough, Massachusetts, and carries Route 113 over the Merrimack River. With a span of 547 feet (167 m), it has the longest span of any steel rib through arch bridges in Massachusetts. It is also the second-oldest steel rib through arch bridge in the state. The bridge is center hinged and features Pratt-type trussing.

== History ==
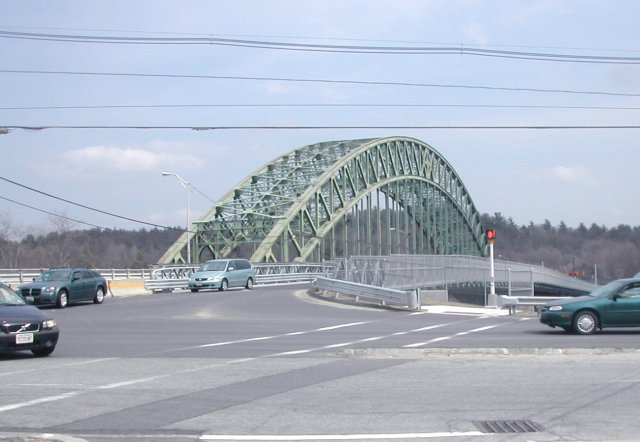
The temporary bridge (right) in use in 2006

The Tyngsborough Bridge was constructed in 1931 to replace the wooden Whipple truss bridge. The new bridge was sited alongside but not parallel to the older, starting close to the old structure on the eastern side of the river but reaching the western side well away of the old bridge. The Tyngsboro Bridge shares its open, braced rib design with the Boston University Bridge.

Starting in 1975 the bridge was rebuilt, but the cost of the construction generated controversy.

In November 2005, the bridge was closed again for repairs following reports of structural deficiency. The temporary Mabey Panel Bridge was constructed alongside of the main bridge and repairs on the main bridge began in 2009. The repair operation was contracted out to S & R Corp. for $16.4 million, but eventually cost $19 million by the completion of the project. This was partially due to delays with steel girders failing stress tests, which required re-engineering, and the discovery that the original bridge had been constructed with lead paint which required S & R Corp. to take measures to ensure that the paint chips did not fall into the river below. The repairs took three years to complete with the bridge reopening in 2012.
