= Old Town Hall (Tyngsborough, Massachusetts) =

- U.S. National Register of Historic Places
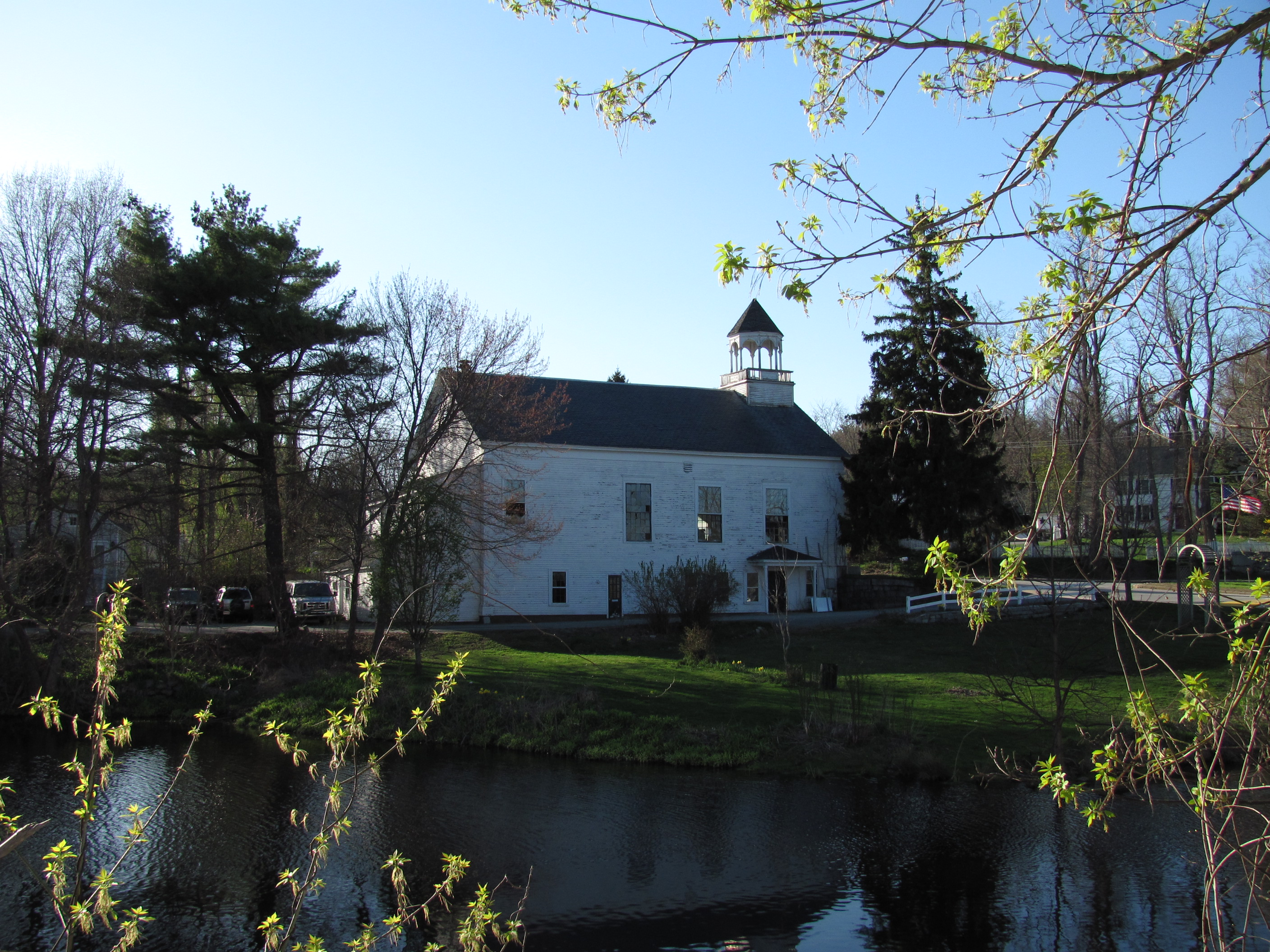
- Old Town Hall

- Location within Massachusetts Location within the United States
- Location: 10 Kendal Road; Tyngsborough, Massachusetts
- Coordinates: 42°40′32″N 71°25′29″W
- Built: 1834
- Architectural style: Federal, Colonial Revival
- NRHP reference No.: 04001574
- Added to NRHP: February 2, 2005

The Old Town Hall is a historic town hall building at 10 Kendal Road in Tyngsborough, Massachusetts. The wood-frame building was built in 1834 as a church to house the local Baptist congregation, a role it served until 1857, when it was sold to the town. The styling of the building is predominantly Federal, although its cupola is a late 19th-century Colonial Revival addition. The building was listed on the National Register of Historic Places in 2005.

After suffering a termite infestation in the 1990s(?), the town hall and the nearby Littlefield Library were closed. Their functions were moved to a new civic building away from the center. In 2012, the building underwent a $2.5 million renovation using Community Preservation Funds. The project concluded in December, 2013 and was reopened to the public in January 2014. It is primarily used for civic events and Special Hearings.

== See also ==
- National Register of Historic Places listings in Middlesex County, Massachusetts
