= 1993 Ramada Hotel drownings =

Hotel pool drowning in Andover, MA

Coordinates: 42.648567°N 71.184261°W

On April 7, 1993, three teenage boys died by drowning in a swimming pool at a Ramada Rolling Green Hotel in Andover, Massachusetts. The deaths resulted in a lawsuit against the Ramada and its owners. The drownings came at a time when many area hotels were being constructed without deep ends in their pools, or were renovating their pools to remove them, according to hospitality industry professionals.

== Background ==
The victims, twin brothers George and Vincent Chin (16) and their brother Winston (13), were from Brooklyn, New York. They were traveling with their uncle Steven Yee, who had paid for the three boys, two of their siblings, and his own three children to join him in a tour group to Boston.

== Drownings ==
The tour buses arrived at the Ramada Rolling Green Hotel in Andover just off Route 133 at around 9:30 p.m. Yee took a shower, while the boys, who did not know how to swim, went to the pool. The pool had a sign posted stating that it closed at 10 p.m.—it also stated that no one under 14 was allowed in the pool without adult supervision. No lifeguard was on duty, and Massachusetts law does not require one at hotel pools. Nor did the pool have a fence or a ladder in the deep end. Andover town law did not require fences around indoor pools; however, Ramada corporate standards did, and the Chin family alleged that state law also required it. As two of the boys played in the pool, their sibling began video-taping them. The water was 9 feet (2.7 m) deep in the deep end.

According to police, at one point Vincent and Winston began moving toward the deep end, until the water was above their heads; their siblings thought they were just playing, but when they did not emerge, their siblings began yelling for help and threw them a life preserver. George dived into the pool in a rescue attempt, while his cousin went into the hotel to try to find someone to help. A pool maintenance man would later testify that he saw them playing in the pool but did not mention this fact to co-workers or managers. At the time, the night manager and another employee were on the way to the pool to close it, but stopped to chat with the pool maintenance man, delaying their arrival. By the time they came to the pool, they found the boys already submerged. The night manager jumped into the pool and pulled them out. However, the employees lacked aquatic rescue skills and could not render further assistance.

Vincent was taken to Lawrence General Hospital in the neighboring town of Lawrence, while Winston was taken to St. John's Hospital (now Saints Medical Center) in Lowell; both were declared dead on arrival. George was still alive when removed from the pool, and was taken by helicopter to Brigham and Women's Hospital in Boston, where he was pronounced dead at 6:18 a.m. the following morning. The parents flew to Boston that day to identify the bodies and arrange their return to New York.

== Aftermath ==
About 500 mourners attended the boys' funeral, which was held on April 13 at the Wah Wing Sang Buddhist funeral home. Mayor David Dinkins spoke briefly. The Brooklyn Chinatown branches of the Lions Club and Kiwanis, together with the Chinese-American Voters' Association, started a fund to provide aid to the family, as the father was then unemployed. Ramada Rolling Green and its owners offered the Chin family a $1.8 million settlement in January 1996, which they rejected. Instead, they filed a wrongful death and negligence suit. They hoped to spark changes in Massachusetts law to require lifeguards at hotel pools, in the way that law in New York City already did. Jury selection was completed on January 29. During deliberations, one member of the jury was dismissed for reading a newspaper article about the case. The remaining members of the jury failed to reach a verdict. On February 16, presiding judge Nancy Gertner declared a mistrial.
