= Col. Jonathan Tyng House =

Historic house in Massachusetts, United States

- U.S. National Register of Historic Places
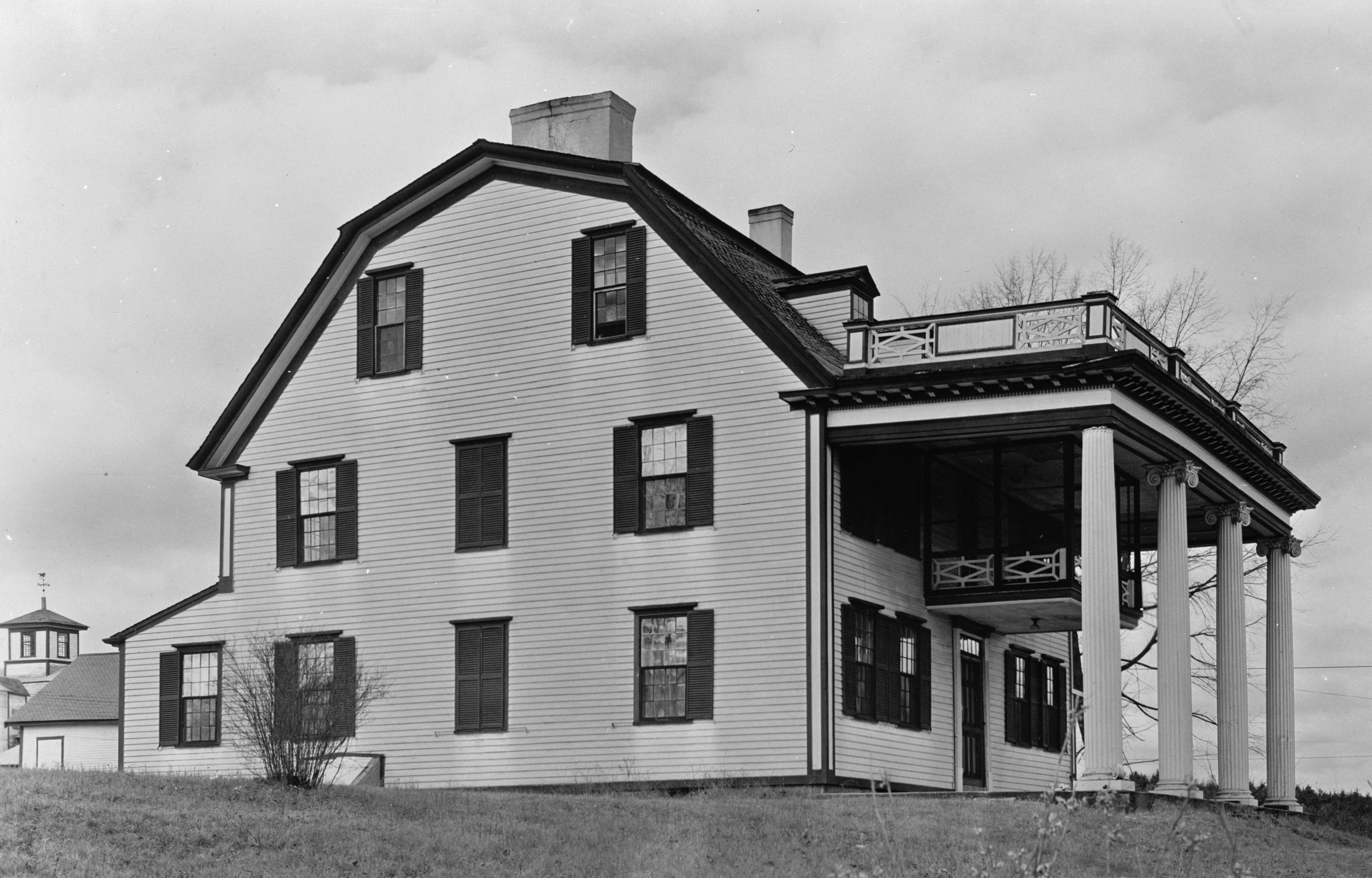
- HABS photo, 1936

- Location within Massachusetts Location within the United States
- Nearest city: Tyngsborough, Massachusetts
- Coordinates: 42°39′37″N 71°24′28″W
- Built: 1675; 351 years ago
- Architect: Jonathan Tyng
- NRHP reference No.: 77000188
- Added to NRHP: August 19, 1977

The Col. Jonathan Tyng House was a historic house on Tyng Road in Tyngsborough, Massachusetts. The oldest portion of this gambrel-roofed wood-frame house was built c. 1675 by Colonel Jonathan Tyng, the son of Edward Tyng for whom Tyngsborough is named. The house had a number of pre-Georgian features, including portholes under the eaves, through which muskets could be fired at attackers, and brick lining in the walls. The upper level also had quarters that were used by the Tyngs to house slaves. The property was listed on the National Register of Historic Places in 1977; It was destroyed by fire on August 11, 1977.

== See also ==
- National Register of Historic Places listings in Middlesex County, Massachusetts
