= Marie Louis Amand Ansart, Marquis de Marisquelles =

French aristocrat and military officer

Marie Louis Amand Ansart de Marisquelles (1742 – 22 May 1804) was a French aristocrat, and military officer born in the town of Maresquelles in the Pas-du-Calais region of France. Ansart was a Colonel in the American Revolution.

== Early life ==
He was born in 1742 in the town of Maresquelles to the Marquis du Marisqulles. He grew up with an older brother, who would be next in line to inherit the title of Marquis du Marisqulles, and two sisters. Ansart spent most of his childhood living a noble lifestyle both at home, and at the home of his uncle; notable French military engineer Marc René, marquis de Montalembert. At the proper age he entered the military academy in which both Marquis de Lafayette and Louis XVI studied and learned their trade from. For the next few years of Ansart's life, he spent much of his time with his uncle studying the art of iron work although he also led a very lavished life style in which he took many trips around France and into Italy. During one such venture in Italy, he engaged in a high-stakes game in which he won many jewels and gold; however as he left he was struck from behind and knocked unconscious. When he awoke he found himself stripped of all clothing and possessions and he also found an open wound from a dirk in his side. He was carried to his hotel in which he stayed for the next few months in order to recover his strength and fight illness.

== Military service and the revolution ==
After returning to France; he joined the Kings Guard and became a confidant of King Louis XVI with whom he was close friends with. Through the royal connections he had with his father and his uncle; he was soon appointed captain of the Infantry. He remained in these positions until the beginning of the American colonies' struggle for independence. Knowing that he had no claim to the title of Marquis de Marisquelles, he set sail for the colonies in 1776.

Upon arriving in Massachusetts, he went to the State House in Boston, and provided his credentials to the court. He made a formal request that the Massachusetts colony would establish foundries for making iron cast cannons. Ansart stated that if the colony would pay the expenses for all land, buildings, machines and all other materials needed, then he would share his technique of furnishing superior cannons and supervise the making of all cannons. In exchange for his services he requested a pension and the rank of Colonel. Along with the rank of Colonel, he was given the title of Inspector of the Foundries of Massachusetts.

On August 31, 1778, Ansart was appointed to help erect defenses for the French fleet stationed in Boston Harbor under Vice Admiral Count d'Estaing. Later that same year, as troops from Massachusetts to Newport, Rhode Island under the command of General John Sullivan, to whom he was appointed aide-de-camp. While stationed there, General James Mitchell Varnum arrived at the camp along with Marquis de Lafayette. During an assault in the Battle of Rhode Island, Ansart was injured which kept him incapacitated for the remainder of the Revolution.

== Later life after the war ==
After injuries suffered in Rhode Island, Ansart returned to Massachusetts, and then married a Marie Wimble, who was the daughter of the Captain of the Guard in Boston. However she died less than a year into the marriage. Although heartbroken, Ansart waited the year of mourning and then proposed to her younger sister, Catherine Wimble. They resided in Boston in the Wimble household, where they had their first two children, until the end of the Revolution. Around 1784, the family moved to Dracut, Massachusetts where they lived in "The Ministree" former home of the Rev. Thomas Parker, first mayor of Dracut. General James Mitchell Varnum was also a resident of Dracut, and with whom he became very close friends with in his later years. The family remained in "The Ministree" until his last days. In the coming years, Catherine bored 10 more children, making 12 in all.

In 1793, after a visit to France while the French Revolution sparked, Ansart applied for naturalization to become a legal United States citizen. In his naturalization he removed all names and titles, and left his name as Louis Ansart. In the years he lived in Dracut, he received multiple visits from Lafayette, who returned to France after the Revolution had finished. On May 22, 1804, Louis Ansart died in his sleep. He now lies in Woodbine Cemetery, Lowell, Massachusetts.
