= Dracut, Massachusetts =

- Town
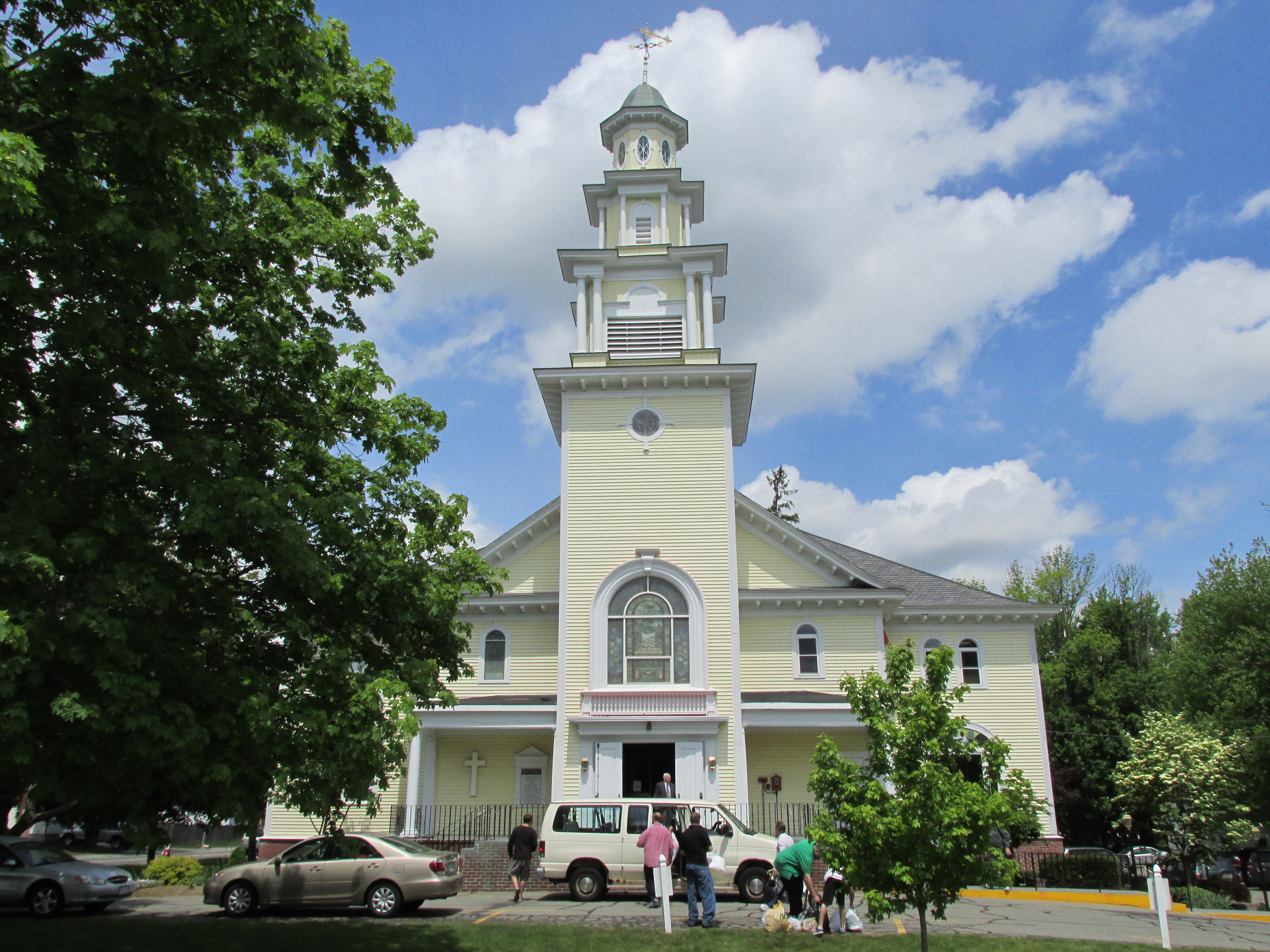
- Christ Church United

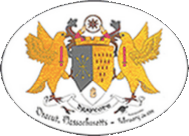
- Seal

- Location in Middlesex County in Massachusetts
- Coordinates: 42°40′N 71°18′W
- Country: United States
- State: Massachusetts
- County: Middlesex
- Settled: 1653
- Incorporated: 1701

Government
  - Type: Open town meeting
  - Board of selectmen: Joshua Taylor, Chair; Donald Plummer; Tony Archinski; Heather Santiago-Hutchings
  - Town manager: Kate Hodges

Area
  - Total: 21.36 sq mi (55.32 km^{2})
  - Land: 20.9 sq mi (54.1 km^{2})
  - Water: 0.46 sq mi (1.2 km^{2})
- Elevation: 156 ft (48 m)

Population (2020)
  - Total: 32,617
  - Density: 1,560.6/sq mi (602.6/km^{2})
  - Demonym: Dracuteer
- Time zone: UTC−5 (Eastern)
  - Summer (DST): UTC−4 (Eastern)
- ZIP Code: 01826
- Area code(s): 978 & 351
- FIPS code: 25-17475
- GNIS feature ID: 0618221
- Website: www.dracutma.gov

Dracut /ˈdreɪkət/ DRAY-kət is a town in Middlesex County, Massachusetts, United States. At the 2020 census, the town's population was 32,617, making it the second most populous town in Massachusetts with an open town meeting system of governance. The town covers a total area of 21.36 square miles, 0.5 square miles of which are water.

== History ==
Before Europeans arrived in the mid-17th century, Dracut and the surrounding area were known as Augumtoocooke. Important Pennacook Native American settlements were served by fishing at Pawtucket Falls on the Merrimack River and abundant game in the surrounding marsh areas. From the late 16th to mid-17th centuries, the powerful Sachem, Passaconaway and his family spent much of their lives on this land.

Europeans began to settle in the area around 1653, and established the town of Chelmsford, incorporated in 1655, on the opposite side of the Merrimack River from modern Dracut. In October 1665, Bess, wife of Nobb How and daughter of Passaconaway, sold the Augumtoocooke land to Captain John Evered, also known as Webb of Draucutt of Norfolk County (the Webb family is associated closely with the town of Dreycot Foliat in Wiltshire, England) for four yards of duffill and one pound of tobacco. Webb had months earlier sold 11,000 acres (45 km^{2}) of the land—which he did not then own—to Samuel Varnum for 400 pounds; the deed for "Drawcutt upon Mirrimack" was dated 1664. Webb also sold land to Richard Shatswell, who traded it to Edward Colburn (also spelled "Coburn" or "Colborne") for his home and land in Ipswich, Massachusetts. Colburn and his family were probably the first settlers in Dracut who owned land with the intention of permanently living on it. (Samuel Varnum lived on the Chelmsford side of the Merrimack River.)

Even though this area, now known to the new settlers as Dracut (Draucutt), was across the Merrimack River from the Chelmsford town center, they agreed to pay taxes and relied on Chelmsford for protection, according to 1667 Middlesex Court documents. By summer 1669, however, protection became too costly and difficult, so the Chelmsford Mayor Henchman declared:

Wherefore, Honorable and Worshipful, I judge it highly needful and necessary that we have relief, and that speedily of about twenty men or more for the repulsing of the enemy and guarding some outplaces, which are considerable on each side of the Merrimac, as Messrs. Howard, Varnum, Coburn & company who must otherwise come in to us, and leave what they have to the enemy, or be exposed to the merciless cruelty of bloody and barbarous men.

On the morning of March 18, 1676, the Wamesit Indians burned down four of Edward Colburne's buildings, then attacked Samuel Varnum and family as they crossed the river to milk the cows grazing in the Dracut pastures. The Indians fired upon their boat, killing Samuel's two sons, and one died in his daughter's arms as she sat behind him. The accompanying soldiers and Samuel fired back, but the Indians fled.

By the late 17th century the Varnum, Coburn, Richardson, and other families of the Dracut section of Chelmsford, dissatisfied with the protection provided, began to petition to the General Court to lay out their own township.

To the Hon. Council & Representatives of his Majesty's Province of the Massachusetts Bay in New England in General Court assembled February 1701. The petition of Samuel Sewall Esq., Benjamin Walker, John Hunt & Jonathan Belcher, proprietors of part of the Tract of Land called Dracut beyond Chelmsford in the County of Middlesex on the North Side of Merrimack River and of Samuel Varnum, ..., Thomas Colburne, ..., James Richardson, ..., Ezra Colburn,... Inhabitants and Proprietors of the said Tract of Land called Dracut, ... lyes very commodious for a Township & hath about twenty families already settled thereupon in which are about Eighty Souls & Forasmuch as the making said place a Township will not only be a great Encouragement to the Inhabitants thereof & be the means for a settlement of the Ministry among them (for the benefit of which they are now obliged to go to Chelmsford, which is a great difficulty & eamiot be attended by their children & several others by reason of the distance thereof) but will also be of considerable benefit to the Publick, and be a great strengthening of the Frontier parts by reason of the people which will be desirous to settle at said place when made a Township because of the convenient positionship thereof.

Your Petitioners humbly pray that by the grant of this Honorable Court, the Tract of land aforesaid may be made a Township, and that the Inhabitants, which are or shall settle thereupon, may have and enjoy all Libertys, Privileges & Immunities as the Inhabitants of other Towns within this Province have & do enjoy. And ... the Tract of Land therein described be made a Township & called by the name of Dracut, ... Sent up by concurrence Nehemiah Jewett, Speaker.

Dracut was granted separation from Chelmsford, and was officially incorporated as a town on February 26, 1701.

Parts of the community were part of the Wamiset Praying Town, one of the preserves set aside by the colonists for Christianized Indians. The town has several large ponds, bogs and swamps, and numerous brooks (most notably Beaver Brook). Dracut's early economy relied on fishing, lumbering and milling, which led in turn to the 19th century industries of paper making and cotton textile manufacturing, including the Beaver Brook Mill. These mills attracted Irish and French-Canadian immigrants. Thomas Barrows was the part owner of one of the mills.

There has been intense modern development in Dracut with suburban residential pressures from Lowell. Twice in the 19th century, Lowell annexed large sections of Dracut into its borders. However, some rural landscapes remain intact, as do some handsome historic houses. One of the better known, the 290-year-old Colburn/Cutter House, with its massive beams, huge center chimney and fireplaces, was torn down in 2023. The building, dating back from about 1717, had served as the site of the annual Dracut Craft Fair. In addition, Dracut holds an annual Old Home Day every September starting in 2001 . As of 2020, Dracut remains the only town in the world with its exact name and spelling. Other municipalities do exist with similar names but different spellings.

== Geography ==
According to the United States Census Bureau, the town has a total area of 21.4 square miles (55 km^{2}), of which 20.9 square miles (54 km^{2}) is land and 0.5 square miles (1.3 km^{2}) (2.15%) is water.

Dracut is located in the Merrimack Valley of Massachusetts, zip code 01826, 30 miles (48 km) northwest of the state capital, Boston.

The southern end of Dracut is on the Merrimack River, and the town is bisected by Beaver Brook.

As part of a plan titled 'Make It Dracut', the town's Economic Development Committee designated nine Business Districts. With a couple exceptions, district names mirror those of historic neighborhoods within the town. Each district is visually identified by strategically placed street signage bearing the district name and a stylized symbol incorporating the initial letter of the name.

The districts are titled: Bridge Street, Broadway, Collinsville, Dracut Center, East Dracut, Hovey Square, Kenwood, Lakeview, and Navy Yard Districts.

=== Adjacent towns ===
Dracut is bordered by Tyngsboro to the west and the city of Lowell to the south and west in Middlesex County, Methuen to the east in Essex County, and Pelham, New Hampshire, to the north in Hillsborough County, New Hampshire. Tewksbury (Middlesex County) and Andover (Essex County) border the town to the south over the Merrimack River. There are no bridges connecting Dracut to Tewksbury or Andover directly, forcing travel through Lowell via several crossings or I-93 in Methuen.

== Demographics ==
Historical population
Year	Pop.	±%
1790	1,217	—
1800	1,274	+4.7%
1810	1,301	+2.1%
1820	1,407	+8.1%
1830	1,615	+14.8%
1840	2,188	+35.5%
1850	3,503	+60.1%
1860	1,881	−46.3%
1870	2,078	+10.5%
1880	1,595	−23.2%
1890	1,996	+25.1%
1900	3,253	+63.0%
1910	3,461	+6.4%
1920	5,280	+52.6%
1930	6,912	+30.9%
1940	7,339	+6.2%
1950	8,666	+18.1%
1960	13,674	+57.8%
1970	18,214	+33.2%
1980	21,249	+16.7%
1990	25,594	+20.4%
2000	28,562	+11.6%
2010	29,457	+3.1%
2020	32,617	+10.7%
2024	32,972	+1.1%
2025*	32,783	−0.6%
* = population estimate. Source: United States census records and Population Estimates Program data.

The earliest census data shows the town of Dracut having a population of 1,173 residents in 1765.

As of the census of 2025, there were 32,783 people and 12,252 households in the town. The population density was 1,577.6 inhabitants per square mile (609.1/km^{2}). There were 12,252 occupied housing units at an average density of 592.5 per square mile (228.8/km^{2}).

The racial makeup of the town was:

- 77.40% White (U.S. Average: 75.1%)
- 5.50% Asian (U.S. Average: 3.6%)
- 5.00% African American (U.S. Average: 12.3%)
- 0.00% Native American (U.S. Average: 0.1%)
- 0.00% Pacific Islander (U.S. Average: 0.1%)
- 2.80% from other races (U.S. Average: 5.5%)
- 9.30% from two or more races (U.S. Average: 2.4%)

Hispanic or Latino of any race were 8.70% of the population (U.S. Average: 12.5%).

There were 10,939 households with the average household size was 2.69 and the average family size was 3.17.

- 35.3% had children under the age of 18 living with them (U.S. Average: 32.8%).
- 55.4% were married couples living together (U.S. Average: 51.7%).
- 12.9% had a female householder with no husband present (U.S. Average: 12.2%).
- 28.2% were non-families (U.S. Average: 31.9%).
- 20.9% of all households were made up of individuals (U.S. Average: 25.8%).
- 8.0% had someone living alone who was 65 years of age or older (U.S. Average: 9.2%).

In the town, the population had a median age of 41.1 years (U.S. Average: 35.3).

- 25.5% under the age of 18
- 7.3% from 18 to 24
- 33.5% from 25 to 44
- 22.2% from 45 to 64
- 11.6% who were 65 years of age or older.

For every 100 females, there were 96.2 males. For every 100 females age 18 and over, there were 92.4 males.

The median income for a household in the town was $57,676 (U.S. Average: $41,994), and the median income for a family was $65,633 (U.S. Average: $50,046). Males had a median income of $41,873 versus $31,396 for females. The per capita income for the town was $23,750. About 2.7% (U.S. Average: 9.2%) of families and 3.7% (U.S. Average: 12.4%) of the population were below the poverty line, including 3.2% of those under age 18 and 8.3% of those age 65 or over.

== Government ==
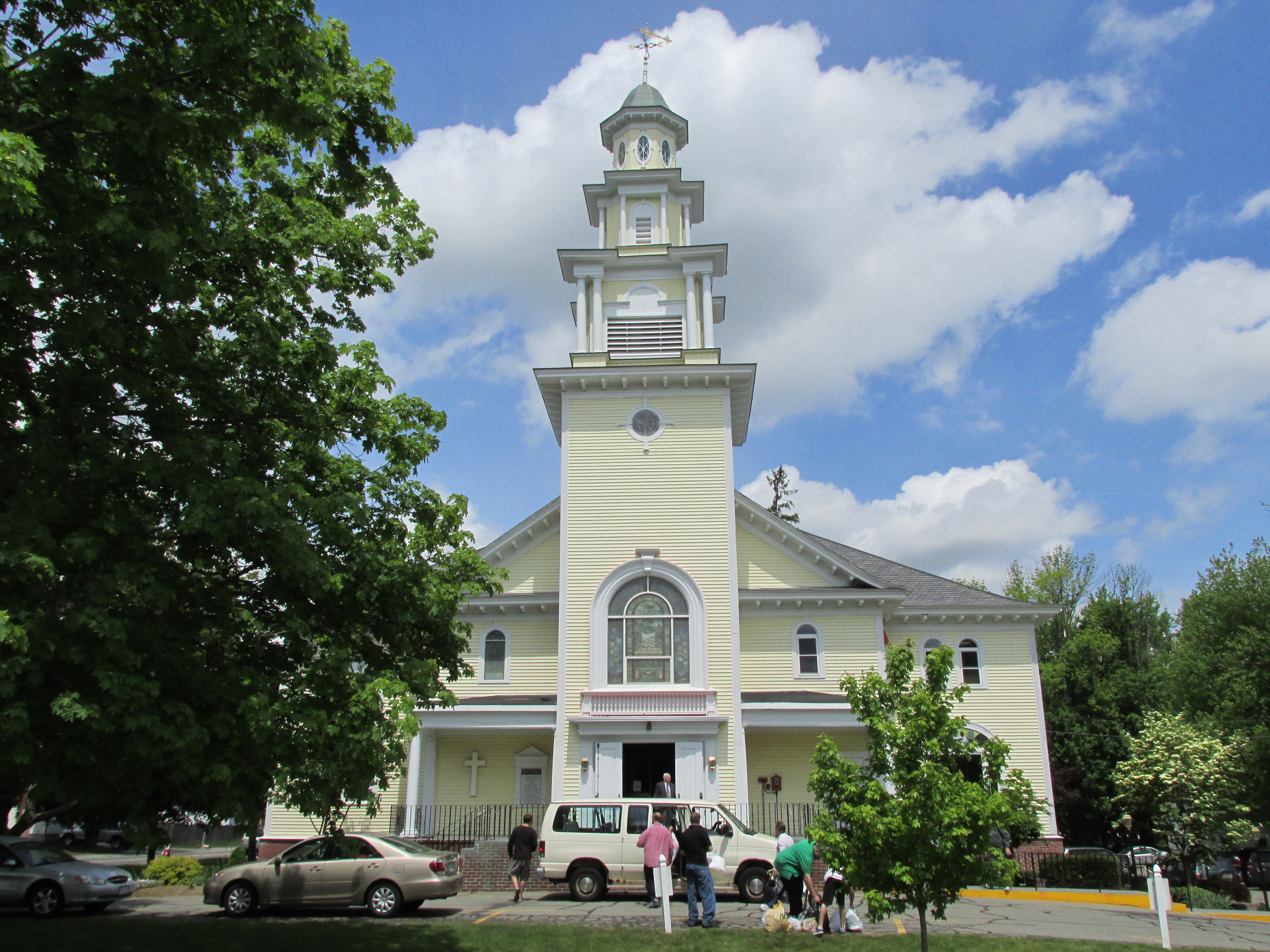
The historic "Old Yellow Meeting House", which now serves as a local congregation of the United Church of Christ in Dracut center (at the intersection of Route 38 and Route 113)

Dracut is one of the largest towns in Massachusetts to still be governed by an open town meeting, whereby every registered voter is entitled to gather at stated times to conduct the business of the Town. There is an elected board of selectmen and school committee with five members each elected for three-year staggered terms. The voters also elect a town moderator, library trustees, and some members of the housing authority. Those who live in the Dracut Water Supply District also elect a district moderator and water commissioners. The board of selectmen, school committee, and library trustees hire a town manager, superintendent of schools, and library director respectively to execute their various duties.

== Public safety ==
=== Police department ===
The town of Dracut has its own full-time police department, the Dracut Police Department, which employs 45 police officers who utilize 16 various types of police vehicles to perform their duties. As of January 2014, the Department has a K-9 unit. The Department's headquarters is located at 110 Loon Hill Road in the Parker Village section of the town. The town of Dracut is also secondarily protected by the Massachusetts State Police and is periodically patrolled by troopers from the A-1 barracks in Andover.

=== Fire department ===
The Dracut Fire Department is a 24/7 career fire department of approximately 43 firefighters. It responds from three fire stations located throughout the town.

Station 1 (Headquarters): 488 Pleasant Street

- Engine 1
- Engine 5
- Engine 4
- Squad 1
- Forestry 1
- Tower 1
- Car 2 (Deputy Chief)
- Car 3
- Car 4 (Shift commander)
- Utility 1

Station 2: 15 Jones Avenue

- Engine 2
- Forestry 2
- Engine 6 (antique)

Station 3: 539 Nashua Road

- Engine 3
- Squad 3
- UTV trailer
- Boat
- State Hazmat ORU 62

== Education ==
=== Public schools ===
The Dracut School Department consists of six public schools: one high school, one middle school (grades 6–8), and four elementary schools (grades K–5). They are, with enrollment figures from the 2020–2021 school year:

- Dracut Senior High School (889 students)
- Richardson Middle School (920 students)
- Englesby Elementary School (544 students)
- Brookside Elementary School (444 students)
- Campbell Elementary School (579 students)
- Greenmont Elementary School (283 students)

The school department also uses the former Parker Elementary School for a small portion of its special education activities. There are about 45 public school students attending out of district SPED programs and approximately 120 public school students attending out of town charter schools, as of FY14. In addition, about 440 Dracut students attend the Greater Lowell Technical High School.

== Transportation ==
Dracut is in proximity to many major area highways. Interstate 93, Interstate 495, and U.S. Route 3 are among the most traveled. Interstate 95 is not far from Dracut either (roughly 15 to 20 miles (24 to 32 km) to the south), and the Massachusetts Turnpike (Interstate 90) is only 30 to 35 miles (48 to 56 km) to the southeast, in Boston. Massachusetts Route 38, Route 110 and Route 113 run directly through the town.

The LRTA 10 bus connects to the Lowell train station on the MBTA Commuter Rail Lowell Line.

The Maritimes & Northeast Pipeline terminates in Dracut, connecting to the North American natural gas pipeline grid. The Portland Natural Gas Transmission System (PNGTS)), Tennessee Gas and the TransQuebec interconnect here.

== Notable people ==
- Luis Ansart (1742–1804), military officer
- Wendell Corey, actor
- Scott Grimes, actor
- Harry Lew, pro basketball player
- Lucy Lew, early African American rights leader
- Roger Morin, Bishop of Biloxi
- John Ogonowski (1951–2001), airline pilot who was piloting American Airlines Flight 11 on 9/11 before it was hijacked
- James Mitchell Varnum, lawyer and general during the American Revolution
- Joseph Bradley Varnum, politician
- Reuben Colburn, boat / ship builder

== See also ==
- Beaver Brook
- Greater Boston
- Greater Lowell
- Merrimack Valley
