= Tyngsborough, Massachusetts =

- Town
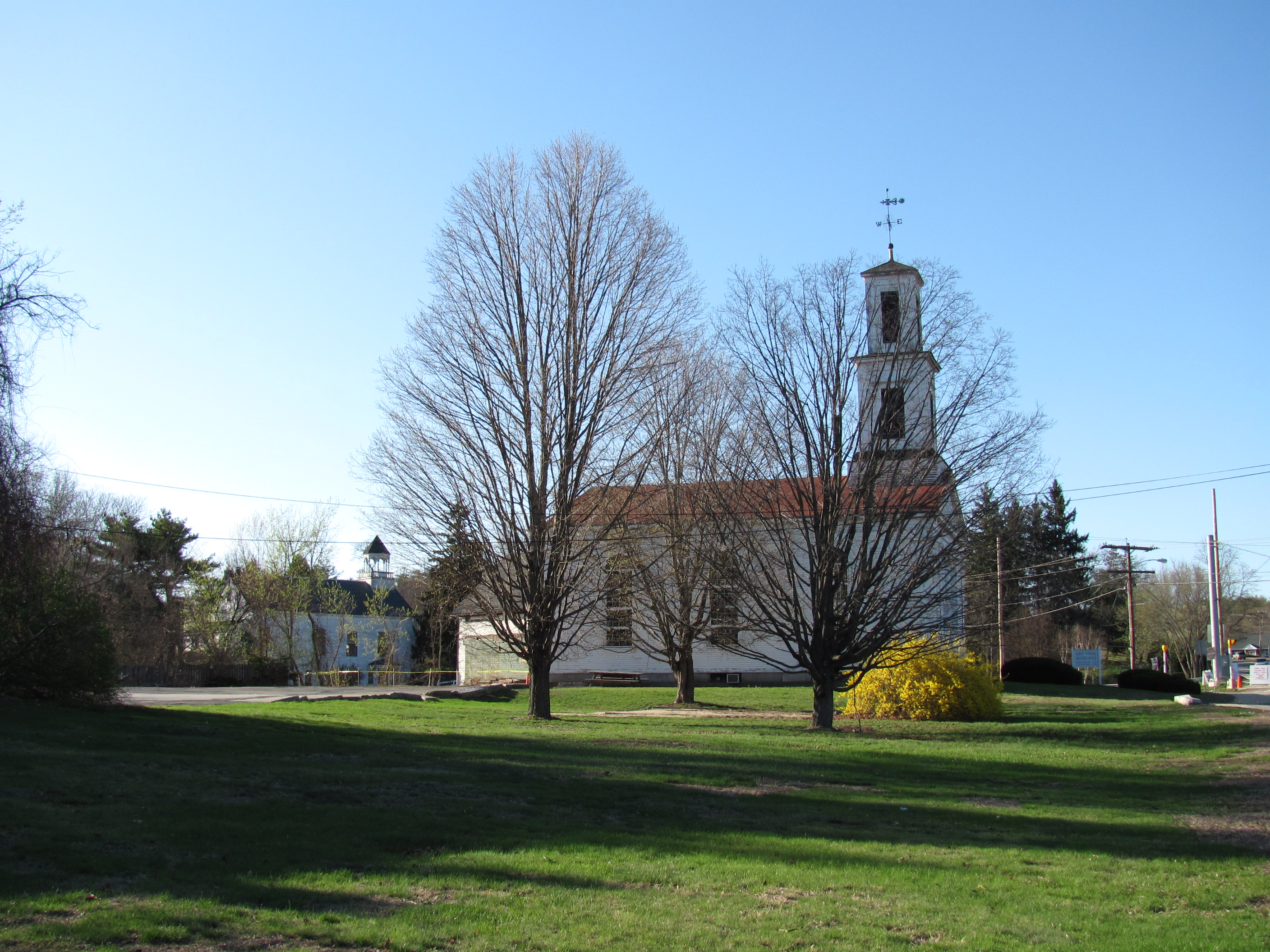
- First Parish Meeting House

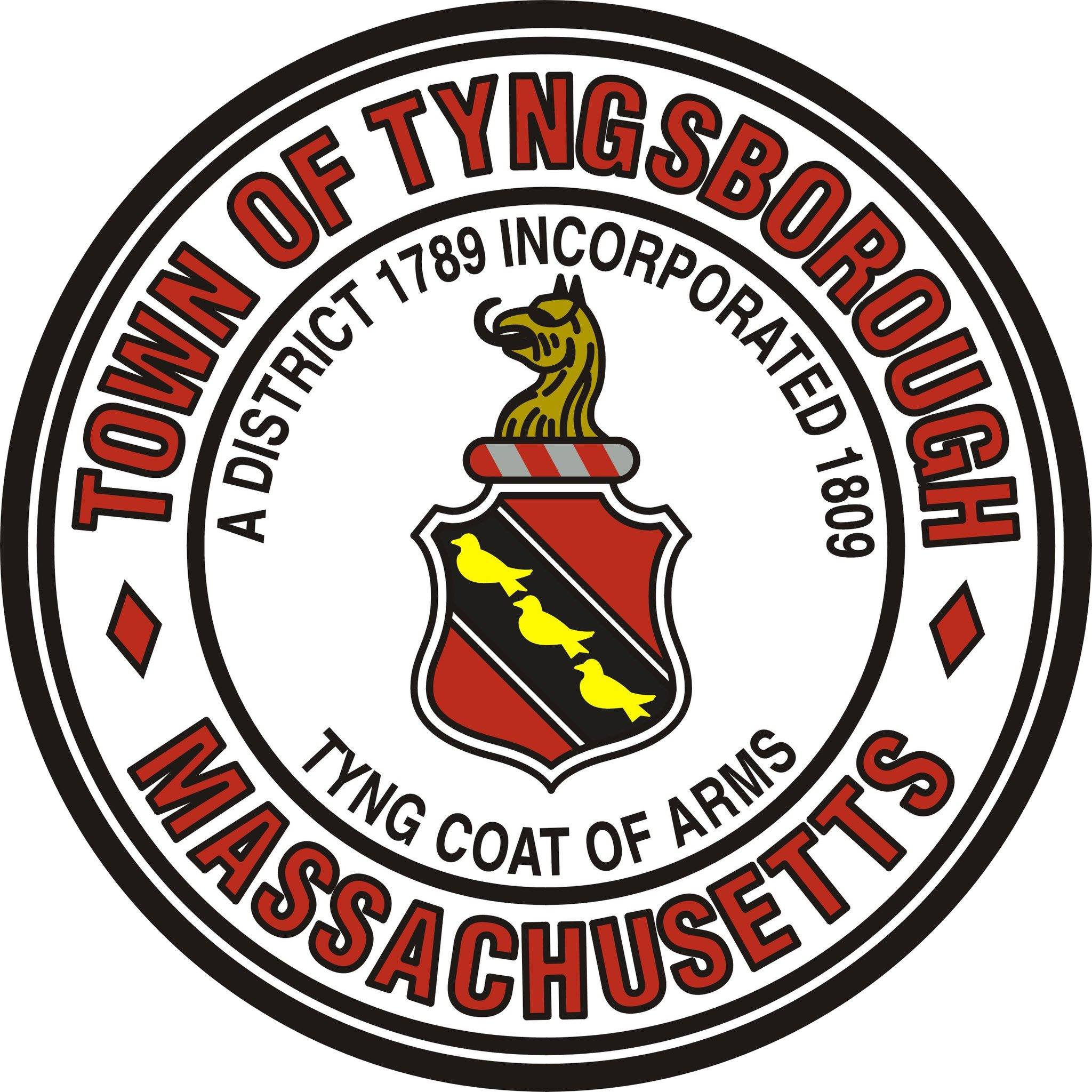
- Seal

- Location in Middlesex County in Massachusetts
- Coordinates: 42°40′18″N 71°25′1″W
- Country: United States
- State: Massachusetts
- County: Middlesex
- Settled: 1661
- Incorporated: 1809

Government
  - Type: Open town meeting

Area
  - Total: 18.0 sq mi (46.7 km^{2})
  - Land: 16.9 sq mi (43.7 km^{2})
  - Water: 1.2 sq mi (3.1 km^{2})
- Elevation: 154 ft (47 m)

Population (2020)
  - Total: 12,380
  - Density: 734/sq mi (283/km^{2})
- Time zone: UTC−5 (Eastern)
  - Summer (DST): UTC−4 (Eastern)
- ZIP Code: 01879
- Area code: 351/978
- FIPS code: 25-71025
- GNIS feature ID: 0618240
- Website: www.tyngsboroughma.gov

Tyngsborough (also spelled Tyngsboro) is a town in northern Middlesex County, Massachusetts, United States. Tyngsborough is 28 miles (45 km) from Boston along the Route 3 corridor, and located on the New Hampshire state line. At the 2020 census, the town population was 12,380. By its location, the town serves as a suburb of neighboring cities such as Nashua, New Hampshire, and Lowell, Massachusetts.

== History ==
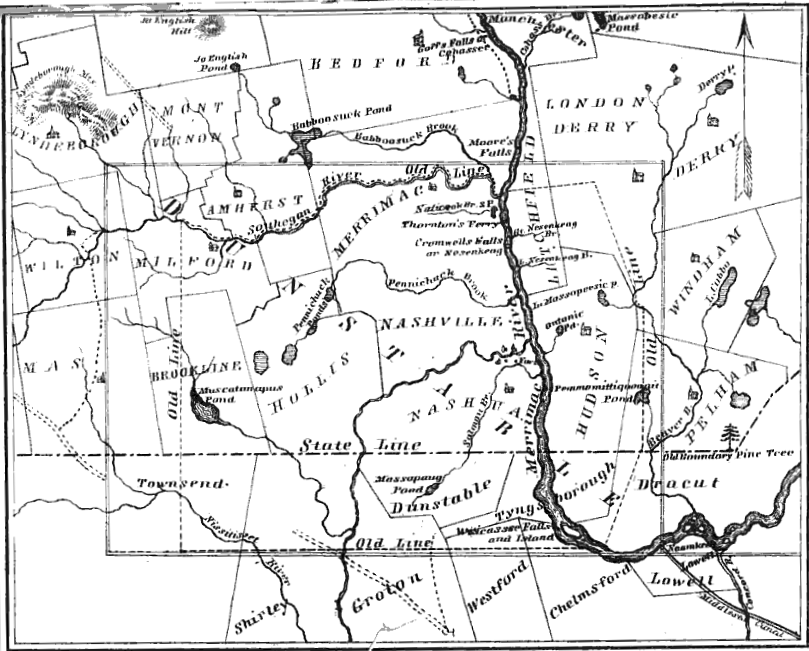
Map of the region of "Old Dunstable" Township, which was later subdivided to form many of the current towns along the Massachusetts-New Hampshire border, including Tyngsborough

Tyngsborough was settled in 1661, as part of the massive Dunstable Township. The town of Dunstable, incorporated in 1673, was named after the hometown of pioneer Edward Tyng. However, a relative of his, and the source of the town of Tyngsborough's name, was Colonel Jonathan Tyng, whose home, the Tyng Mansion House, was one of the oldest north of Boston. He settled near the Merrimack in what is now Tyngsborough in 1675. The house stood until the 1970s, when it was destroyed by arson. Early on Tyngsborough residents fought a series of small and bloody skirmishes with local Native American tribes. Evidence of this can be found in several old colonial homes in town that still have emergency passages that were used during these attacks. In 1789, Tyngsborough's parish split from the rest of Dunstable, making Tyngsborough a recognized district. On February 23, 1809, Tyngsborough became a town.

After Tyngsborough was incorporated it became known for its ferries which traveled up and down the Merrimack River, the quarries that produced granite, and several box companies that started in town. As the town developed, Tyngsborough became a vacation community and had a large seasonal resident population even up until the late 1960s. A notable summer resident was actress Nance O'Neil, whose estate became the campus of the Academy of Notre Dame.

Today, Tyngsborough primarily serves as a bedroom community, part of Greater Lowell and the Nashua, New Hampshire, region, in addition to having a relatively short commute to the Boston area. The town is also known for the Tyngsborough Bridge, a green painted, single-arched, steel bridge over the Merrimack River. Constructed in 1931 as a replacement for an earlier wooden planked structure, this bridge is a major river crossing for residents of Massachusetts and New Hampshire alike with 22,300 daily crossings as of 2007.

Historical population
Year	Pop.	±%
1790	382	—
1850	799	+109.2%
1860	626	−21.7%
1870	629	+0.5%
1880	631	+0.3%
1890	662	+4.9%
1930	1,358	+105.1%
1940	1,634	+20.3%
1950	2,059	+26.0%
1960	3,302	+60.4%
1970	4,204	+27.3%
1980	5,683	+35.2%
1990	8,642	+52.1%
2000	11,081	+28.2%
2010	11,292	+1.9%
2020	12,380	+9.6%
2024	12,779	+3.2%
Source: US Census data.

== Government ==
The town uses an Open Town Meeting model with a Select Board overseeing the operation of the town. Reporting to the Select Board is the Town Manager who oversees the public employees and day-to-day operations of the town offices. Other elected boards include the Planning Board, School Committee, Finance Committee, Library Trustees, Cemetery Commission, Board of Health, and Sewer Commission.

Tyngsborough is represented in the Massachusetts House of Representatives as a part of the 36th Middlesex District. The town is represented in the Massachusetts Senate as a part of the First Middlesex District. The town is patrolled by the Tyngsborough Police Department with Rich Howe as its Chief and Station A-1, SP Andover Barracks of Troop A of the Massachusetts State Police.

At the federal level, Tyngsborough is a part of Massachusetts's 3rd congressional district, and is currently represented by Lori Trahan. The state's senior (Class II) member of the United States Senate, is Elizabeth Warren. The junior senator from Massachusetts is Ed Markey who was elected in 2013.

== Geography ==
According to the United States Census Bureau, the town has a total area of 18.0 square miles (47 km^{2}), of which 16.9 square miles (44 km^{2}) is land and 1.2 square miles (3.1 km^{2}) (6.65%) is water.

Besides a series of lakes and ponds that dot Tyngsborough, the town is split in two by the Merrimack River, which runs roughly north–south near the center of town. The land is mostly rolling hills, small cleared fields, and wooded land. Marshlands can also be found in the area, although they are less prevalent than in surrounding towns.

== Transportation ==
The LRTA 10 bus connects eastern Tyngsborough with Dracut and the Lowell train station on the MBTA Commuter Rail Lowell Line.

== Schools ==
The Tyngsborough Public School district is coterminous with the town, and supports three schools containing a total of 2,300 students between them.

- Tyngsborough Elementary School (grades Pre-K–5)
- Tyngsborough Middle School (grades 6–8)
- Tyngsborough High School (grades 9–12)

Additionally, Tyngsborough is home to Greater Lowell Technical High School, a public vocational school which serves the towns of Tyngsborough, Dracut, and Dunstable as well as the city of Lowell. There is also one private school in Tyngsborough, the Academy of Notre Dame.

The town also has one public charter school, Innovation Academy Charter School, serving over 800 students in grades 5 through 12. Innovation Academy moved to the town in September 2008 from neighboring Chelmsford.

There are no colleges or universities in Tyngsborough, although Boston University once maintained a corporate education facility there, but it has since been moved to nearby Chelmsford.

The Winslow School is a former school which was located on Winslow Drive. It opened in 1895 and closed in the early 2000s. The school was named after Sarah Winslow, who acquired a trust from Harvard College that is still an income for Tyngsborough. It was two stories high and 17,569 square feet in area. It had tennis courts, and playing fields in the back. As of 2014, the school lies abandoned in the Tyngsborough town center.

== Demographics ==
As of the census of 2000, there were 11,081 people, 3,731 households, and 2,947 families residing in the town. The population density was 657.4 inhabitants per square mile (253.8/km^{2}). There were 3,806 housing units at an average density of 225.8 per square mile (87.2/km^{2}). The racial makeup of the town was 95.63% White, 0.50% African American, 0.23% Native American, 2.48% Asian, 0.04% Pacific Islander, 0.14% from other races, and 0.99% from two or more races. Hispanic or Latino of any race were 1.11% of the population.

There were 3,731 households, out of which 44.6% had children under the age of 18 living with them, 67.5% were married couples living together, 8.5% had a female householder with no husband present, and 21.0% were non-families. Of all households, 16.1% were made up of individuals, and 4.9% had someone living alone who was 65 years of age or older. The average household size was 2.97 and the average family size was 3.37.

In the town, the population was spread out, with 30.3% under the age of 18, 5.7% from 18 to 24, 35.7% from 25 to 44, 21.6% from 45 to 64, and 6.6% who were 65 years of age or older. The median age was 35 years. For every 100 females, there were 97.5 males. For every 100 females age 18 and over, there were 94.5 males.

The median income for a household in the town was $102,818, and the median income for a family was $114,680. Males had a median income of $46,942 versus $33,396 for females. The per capita income for the town was $41,249. About 4.0% of families and 4.7% of the population were below the poverty line, including 6.2% of those under age 18 and 5.6% of those age 65 or over.

== Points of interest ==
- Lowell-Dracut-Tyngsboro State Forest
- Old Town Hall
- Tyngsborough Bridge
- Vesper Country Club

== Notable people ==
- Raymond Boucher, attorney
- Laura Gerraughty, American shot putter
- Seán Sammon, priest
- Esther Wilkins, dentist and author of Clinical Practice of the Dental Hygienist
