= Dracut High School =

Coordinates: 42°40′29.7″N 71°20′10.8″W

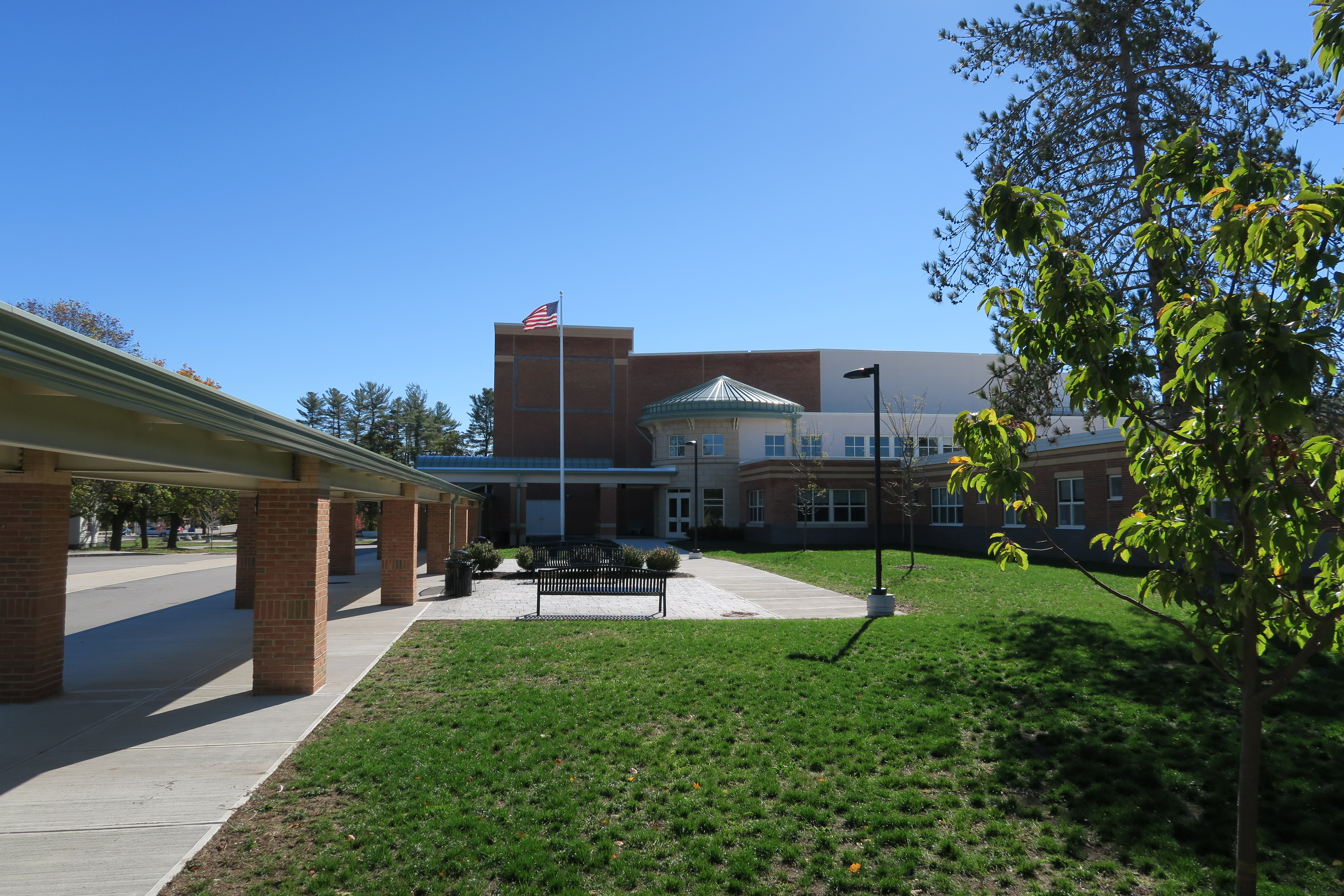
- Front Entrance
- 1540 Lakeview Avenue; Dracut, MA 01826; United States

Information
- Type: Public; High school Open enrollment
- School district: Dracut Public Schools
- Superintendent: Steven Stone
- Principal: Richard Manley
- Faculty: 60.0
- Teaching staff: 61.41 (FTE)
- Grades: 9-12
- Enrollment: 792 (2024–2025)
- Student to teacher ratio: 12.90
- Colors: Navy Blue; Columbia Blue; White
- Team name: Middies
- Newspaper: The Navigator
- Website: www.dracutps.org/o/dhs

Dracut Senior High School is the public senior high school in the Merrimack Valley town of Dracut, Massachusetts, United States.

The high school's colors are Columbia blue, navy blue and white. The team name is the Middies and the symbol is an anchor, or a “Block ‘D’”. These are references to midshipmen, as historically, the town was a place where U.S. Navy uniforms were created. The original Dracut High was built in the early 1950s and was frequently overcrowded, as roughly 1,600 students attend the school that was built for a fraction of that number, approximately 900. However, in 2011, the Massachusetts School Building Authority approved funding to construct a new Dracut High School. The majority of the project is completed as of October 2014.

Dracut is known for their performing arts program, specifically for their show choir, a cappella vocal ensemble, and marching band.

== Demographics ==
According to Massachusetts Department of Elementary and Secondary Education annual statistics, for the 2019-2020 academic year, the demographic enrollment distributions for race, gender and grade level at Dracut High School are as follows:

Total number of enrolled students: 877
Total number of full-time equivalent educators: 60.0
Therefore, the student to teacher ratio for this school is 14.6:1

Enrollment by Race/Ethnicity (2019-2020)
Race	Enrolled Pupils*	% of District
African American	78	8.9%
Asian	70	8.0%
Hispanic	58	6.6%
Native American	8	0.9%
White	642	73.2%
Native Hawaiian, Pacific Islander	0	0%
Multi-Race, Non-Hispanic	21	2.4%
Total	877	100%

* Approximate number of enrolled pupils is calculated based on total number of students in district, multiplied by reported percentage, and rounded to nearest whole student.

Enrollment by gender (2019-2020)
Gender	Enrolled pupils	Percentage
Female	431	49.14%
Male	446	50.86%
Non-binary	0	0%
Total	877	100%

Enrollment by Grade
Grade	Pupils Enrolled	Percentage
9	225	25.66%
10	222	25.31%
11	230	26.23%
12	199	22.69%
SP*	1	0.11%
Total	877	100%

* SP = Special Education Beyond Grade 12
