= Dunstable, Massachusetts =

- Town
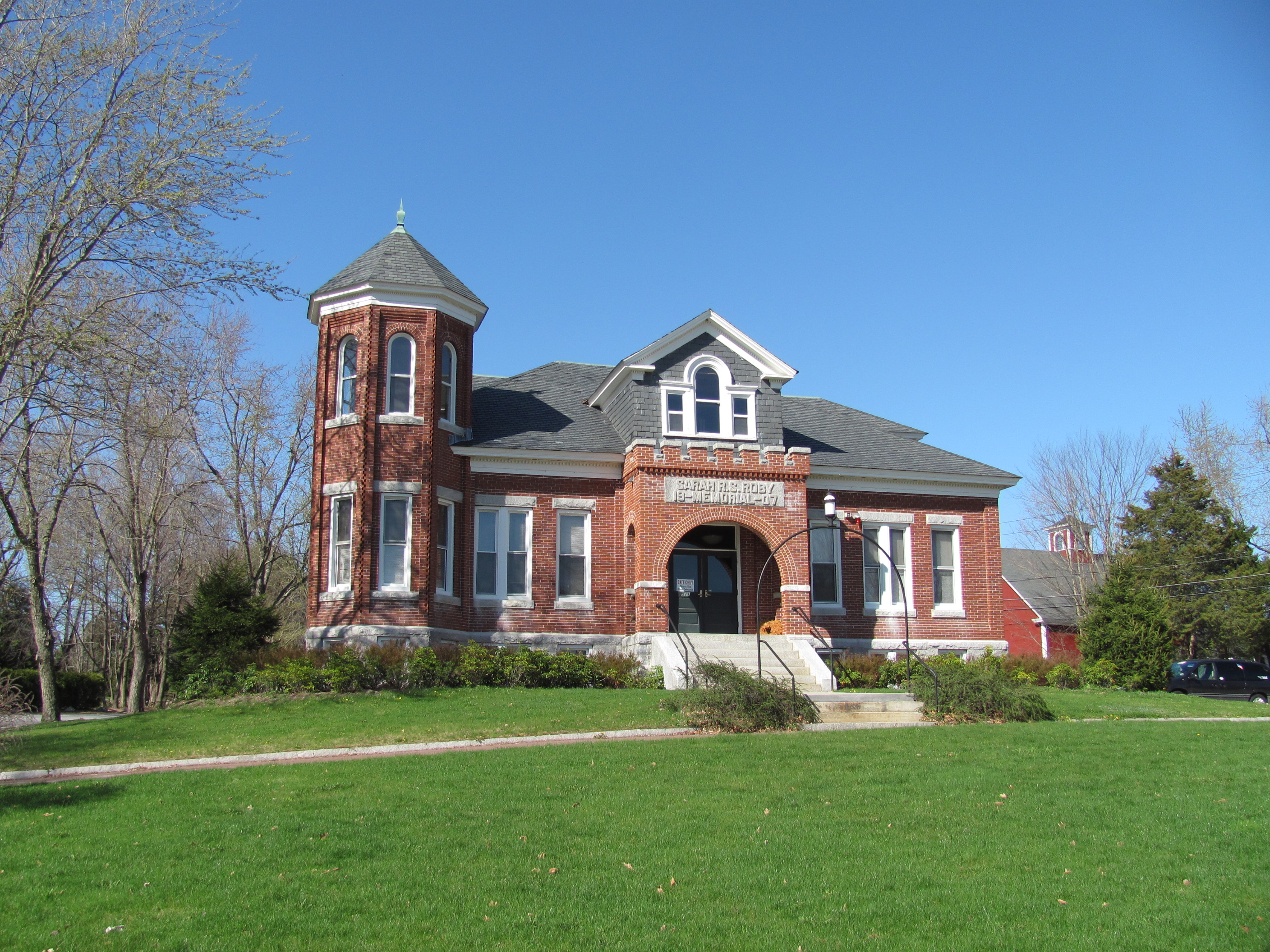
- The town hall

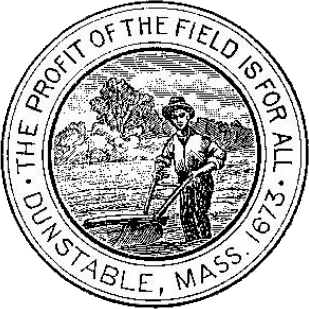
- Seal
- Motto: "The Profit of the Field is for All"
- Location in Middlesex County in Massachusetts
- Coordinates: 42°40′30″N 71°29′00″W
- Country: United States
- State: Massachusetts
- County: Middlesex
- Settled: 1656
- Incorporated: 1673

Government
  - Type: Open town meeting
  - Town Manager: Jason Silva

Area
  - Total: 16.8 sq mi (43.4 km^{2})
  - Land: 16.6 sq mi (42.9 km^{2})
  - Water: 0.19 sq mi (0.5 km^{2})
- Elevation: 223 ft (68 m)

Population (2020)
  - Total: 3,358
  - Density: 203/sq mi (78.3/km^{2})
- Time zone: UTC-5 (Eastern)
  - Summer (DST): UTC-4 (Eastern)
- ZIP code: 01827
- Area code: 351 / 978
- FIPS code: 25-17825
- GNIS feature ID: 0618222
- Website: http://www.dunstable-ma.gov/

Dunstable (/ˈdʌnstəbəl/ DUN-stə-bəl) is a town in Middlesex County, Massachusetts, United States. The population was 3,358 at the 2020 census.

== Etymology ==
Dunstable was named after its sister town Dunstable, England. There are several theories concerning its modern name. In one version, legend tells that the lawlessness of the time was personified in a thief called Dun. Wishing to capture Dun, the King stapled his ring to a post daring the robber to steal it. It was, and was subsequently traced to the house of the widow Dun. Her son, the robber, was taken and hanged to the final satisfaction that the new community bore his name. Another theory is that it comes from the Anglo-Saxon for "the boundary post of Duna". A third version is that the name is derived from Dunum, or Dun, a hill, and Staple, a marketplace.

== History ==
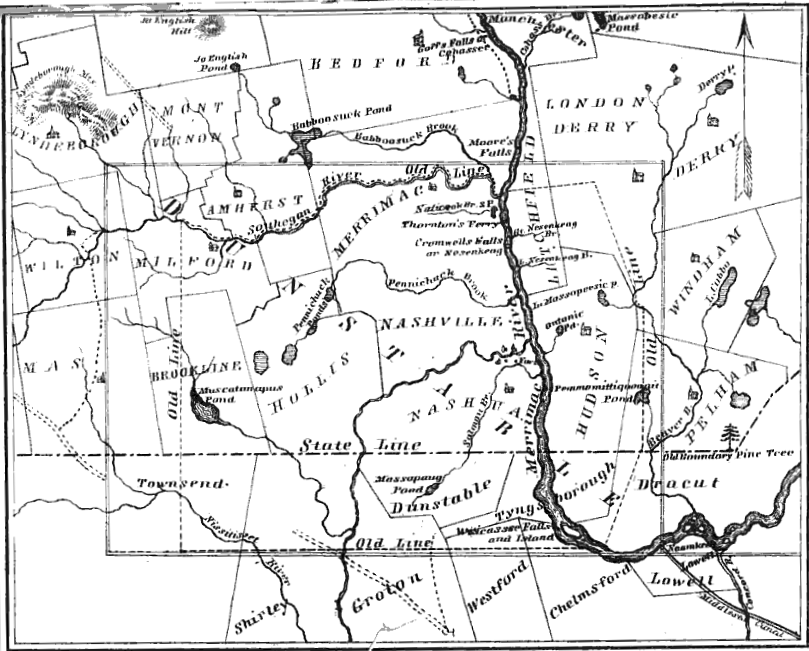
Old map of Dunstable from 1846 showing the towns and the disputed state line with the original Dunstable tract line

Dunstable was first settled by Europeans in 1656 and was officially incorporated in 1673. It is likely named after the town of Dunstable in Bedfordshire, England, home of Edward Tyng, the town's first settler. The original township of Dunstable, granted in 1661, consisted of two hundred square miles, including the Massachusetts towns of Dunstable, Pepperell, Townsend and Tyngsborough, the New Hampshire towns of Hudson, Nashua and Hollis, and parts of other towns as well. Increases in population leading to subsections becoming independent towns and the delineation of the northern boundary of Massachusetts in 1740 placed the northern part of Dunstable (present day Nashua) in New Hampshire, so the southern part remains the Dunstable of today.

Today, Dunstable, in the face of urban sprawl, has held onto a largely rural character.

== Geography ==
According to the United States Census Bureau, the town has a total area of 16.7 square miles (43 km^{2}), of which 16.5 square miles (43 km^{2}) is land and 0.2 square miles (0.52 km^{2}) (1.13%) is water. Dunstable is bordered by Pepperell to the west, Groton to the south, Tyngsborough to the east, and Nashua and Hollis, New Hampshire, to the north.

The main road and only numbered route through Dunstable is Route 113; the nearest limited-access highway is US 3, two miles to the east. Dunstable does not have any public transportation in the form of trains or buses.

== Demographics ==
Historical population
Year	Pop.	±%
1790	380	—
1850	590	+55.3%
1860	487	−17.5%
1870	471	−3.3%
1880	453	−3.8%
1890	416	−8.2%
1900	427	+2.6%
1910	408	−4.4%
1920	353	−13.5%
1930	384	+8.8%
1940	447	+16.4%
1950	522	+16.8%
1960	824	+57.9%
1970	1,292	+56.8%
1980	1,671	+29.3%
1990	2,236	+33.8%
2000	2,829	+26.5%
2010	3,179	+12.4%
2020	3,358	+5.6%
2024*	3,500	+4.2%
* = population estimate. Source: United States census records and Population Estimates Program data.

As of the census of 2000, there were 2,826 people, 923 households, and 798 families residing in the town. The population density was 171.0 inhabitants per square mile (66.0/km^{2}). There were 944 housing units at an average density of 57.0 per square mile (22.0/km^{2}). The racial makeup of the town was 97.49% White, 0.11% African American, 0.04% Native American, 1.52% Asian, 0.07% from other races, and 0.78% from two or more races. Hispanic or Latino of any race were 0.53% of the population.

There were 923 households, out of which 47.5% had children under the age of 18 living with them, 76.7% were married couples living together, 7.2% had a female householder with no husband present, and 13.5% were non-families. 10.3% of all households were made up of individuals, and 3.7% had someone living alone who was 65 years of age or older. The average household size was 3.07 and the average family size was 3.31.

In the town, the population was spread out, with 31.1% under the age of 18, 4.4% from 18 to 24, 31.4% from 25 to 44, 26.2% from 45 to 64, and 6.8% who were 65 years of age or older. The median age was 37 years. For every 100 females, there were 97.7 males. For every 100 females age 18 and over, there were 93.3 males.

The median income for a household in the town was $86,633, and the median income for a family was $92,270. Males had a median income of $61,425 versus $39,946 for females. The per capita income for the town was $30,608. About 2.1% of families and 1.9% of the population were below the poverty line, including 2.4% of those under age 18 and 2.1% of those age 65 or over.

== Climate ==
In a typical year, Dunstable, Massachusetts temperatures fall below 50 °F (10 °C) for 195 days per year. Annual precipitation is typically 44.2 inches per year (high in the US) and snow covers the ground 68 days per year, or 18.6% of the year (high for the US). It may be helpful to understand the yearly precipitation by imagining nine straight days of moderate rain per year. The humidity is below 60% for approximately 25.4 days, or 7% of the year.

== Education ==
=== District schools ===
- Boutwell School
- Swallow Union Elementary School
- Florence Roche Elementary School
- Groton-Dunstable Regional Middle School
- Groton-Dunstable Regional High School
- Prescott Elementary School (Closed after the 2007–2008 school year due to budget cuts)

=== Other public schools ===
- Greater Lowell Technical High School – Public Regional Technical High School in Tyngsborough

== Points of interest ==
- "The Little Red Schoolhouse" is a historical building located on route 113 near the Tyngsborough border. This school house originally came from Tyngsborough. Local students take field trips there to historically re-enact a school day. An annual Strawberry Festival is also held there. Boy Scout Troop 28 of Dunstable holds a Mother's Day pancake breakfast there every year.
- The "Sarah R. S. Roby" Town Hall in located at 511 Main Street (Rt. 113) was built in 1909 and renovated in 2003. Most town offices are located here as well as meeting rooms for various meetings and events.
- The Town Commons across from the Dunstable Town Hall on Rt. 113 is the site of many town events including the summer "Concerts on the Common" live performance series and the Grange Fair in August. This is also the site for the annual auto in Dunstable.
- The Dunstable Evangelical Congregational Church (DECC) is located at 518 Main Street, adjacent to the Town Commons and directly across from Town Hall. While the congregation was established in that location in 1831, the current building dates from the early 1900s. Because it is the only church in town, it is often called simply "the Dunstable Church".
- The Dunstable Free Library is located at 588 Main Street. In addition to the collection of books, periodicals, movies, children's activities and historic items (which include a collection of typewriters and miscellaneous Girl Scouting materials), it is the site of many community activities as well as the site for town elections.
- Blanchard Hill is a 39-acre (16 ha) conservation area and the site of a former ski resort.

== Notable people ==
- Isaac Fletcher (1784–1842), United States Representative from Vermont
- Colleen Green (born 1984), independent musician
- Amos Kendall (1789–1869), United States Postmaster General during the administration of Andrew Jackson
- Amos Lawrence (1786–1852), merchant and philanthropist
- John Lovewell (1691–1725), Colonial militia captain who fought in Father Rale's War
- Samuel Parris (1653–1720), Puritan minister during the Salem witch trials
- Ellen Swallow Richards (1842–1911), chemist, first woman admitted to MIT
