= Lowell General Hospital - Saints Campus =

- Tufts Medicine
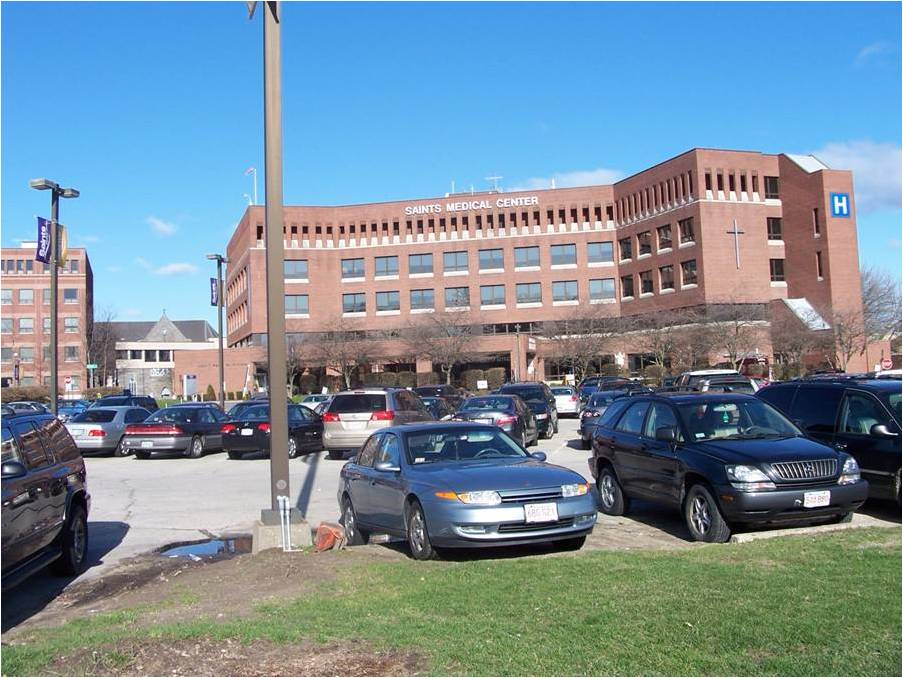
- Saints Campus viewed from Nesmith Street

Geography
- Location: Lowell, Middlesex County, Massachusetts, United States
- Coordinates: 42°38′44″N 71°18′04″W

Organization
- Type: General
- Network: Tufts Medicine

History
- Former names: Saints Medical Center; Saints Memorial Medical Center
- Opened: 1992

Links
- Website: www.tuftsmedicine.org/get-care/locations/lowell-general-hospital/lowell-general-saints-campus
- Lists: Hospitals in Massachusetts

Lowell General Hospital – Saints Campus is a hospital located at One Hospital Drive in Lowell, Massachusetts. Formerly "Saints Medical Center," it became a part of Lowell General Hospital in 2012.

The hospital was created out of a 1992 merger of two of the three hospitals in the city, St. Joseph's Hospital founded in 1839 and St. John's Hospital founded in 1867. The name changed to "Saints Medical Center" in 2006.

In 2010 The hospital was renamed from Saints Memorial Medical Center to Saints Medical Center.

On July 1, 2012 Saints merged with Lowell General Hospital. Several Saints satellite facilities have been reconfigured or cut back following the merger.

In spring 2023, Saints Medical Center received a B grading according to hospital safety grades.

== History ==
Saints Memorial Medical Center was created in 1992 with the merger of St. Joseph's Hospital and St. John's Hospital, both Lowell institutions since the 1800s. The name was changed in 2006 to Saints Medical Center.

St. Joseph's began as the Lowell Corporation Hospital, established in 1839 by area mill owners for the care of their employees. Housed in the mansion of the late Kirk Boott, the founder and owner of the Boott Mills in Lowell, it was the first industrial hospital in America and, for 27 years, the only hospital in Lowell. If the employees were unable to pay, the mills for which they worked would reimburse the corporation. No patient was turned away for lack of funds. In 1840, a 15-bed children's ward was opened, the first such facility in Massachusetts.

In 1891, Lowell Corporation Hospital appointed the first woman physician, Sara A. Williams, M.D., to its staff. On November 1, 1930, the deed of the hospital was transferred to the Archdiocese of Boston and placed under the direction of the Oblates with the Grey Nuns of the Cross of Ottawa acting as management. The facility then became known as St. Joseph's Hospital of Lowell.

Ultimately, the rapid growth and changing demographics of Lowell in the following decades created the need for additional hospitals. With the waves of new immigrants came the need for health care services with a broader focus. Many of those arriving in Lowell with no jobs found themselves ineligible to use the services of the Lowell Corporation Hospital.

The need for a health care facility to treat the people of Irish heritage was evident to Father John O'Brien, pastor of St. Patrick Parish (after whom Father John's Medicine is named) and Sister Emerentiana, Mother Superior of the Sisters of Charity of St. Vincent de Paul at St. Peter's Church. In 1867, they purchased land on Livermore Street, and with it, an old yellow house. With 12 very sick patients, they started a small hospital, known as St. John's Hospital.

Over the years, St. Joseph's and St. John's Hospitals grew to serve more than 100,000 people each year. When the two hospitals merged in 1992 to form Saints Memorial Medical Center, the organization became the Merrimack Valley's largest health care provider.
