= Gloucester, Essex and Beverly Street Railway =

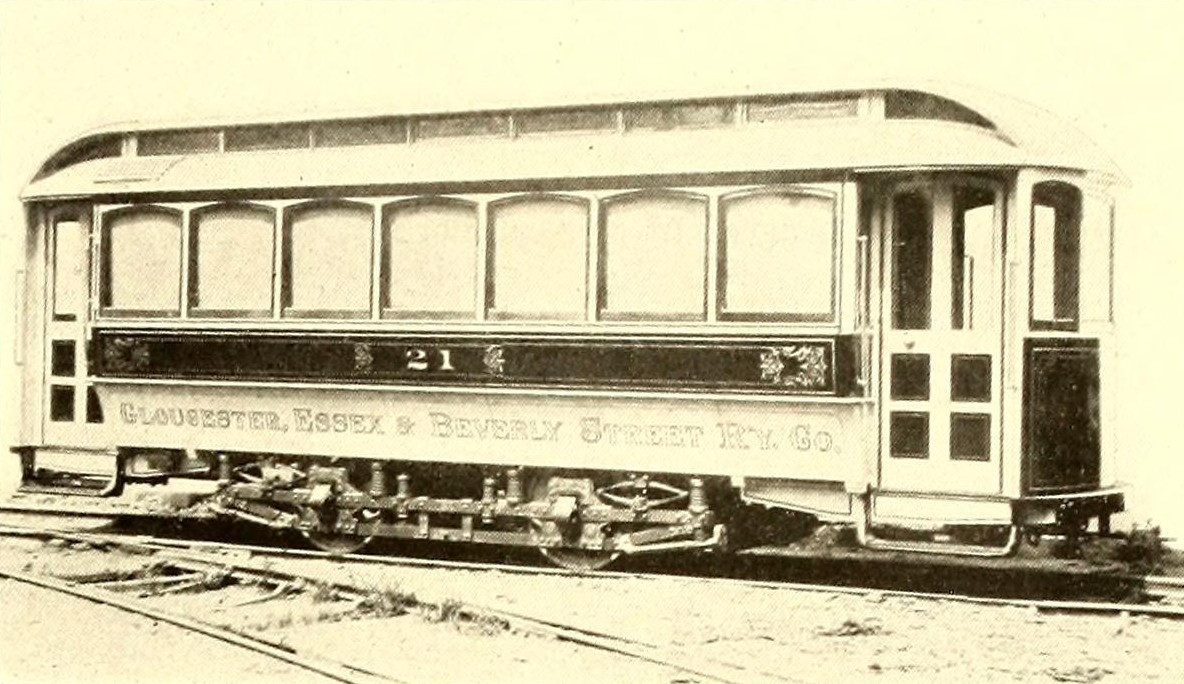
A GE&B streetcar in 1898

The Gloucester, Essex & Beverly Street Railway was a former street railway operating in the Cape Ann region of Massachusetts. Incorporated in 1893 in Gloucester, the railway first opened for operation on August 21, 1895, and was completed in its entirety by September 30, 1896. The railway was sold to the Gloucester Street Railway in 1900.

== Route ==
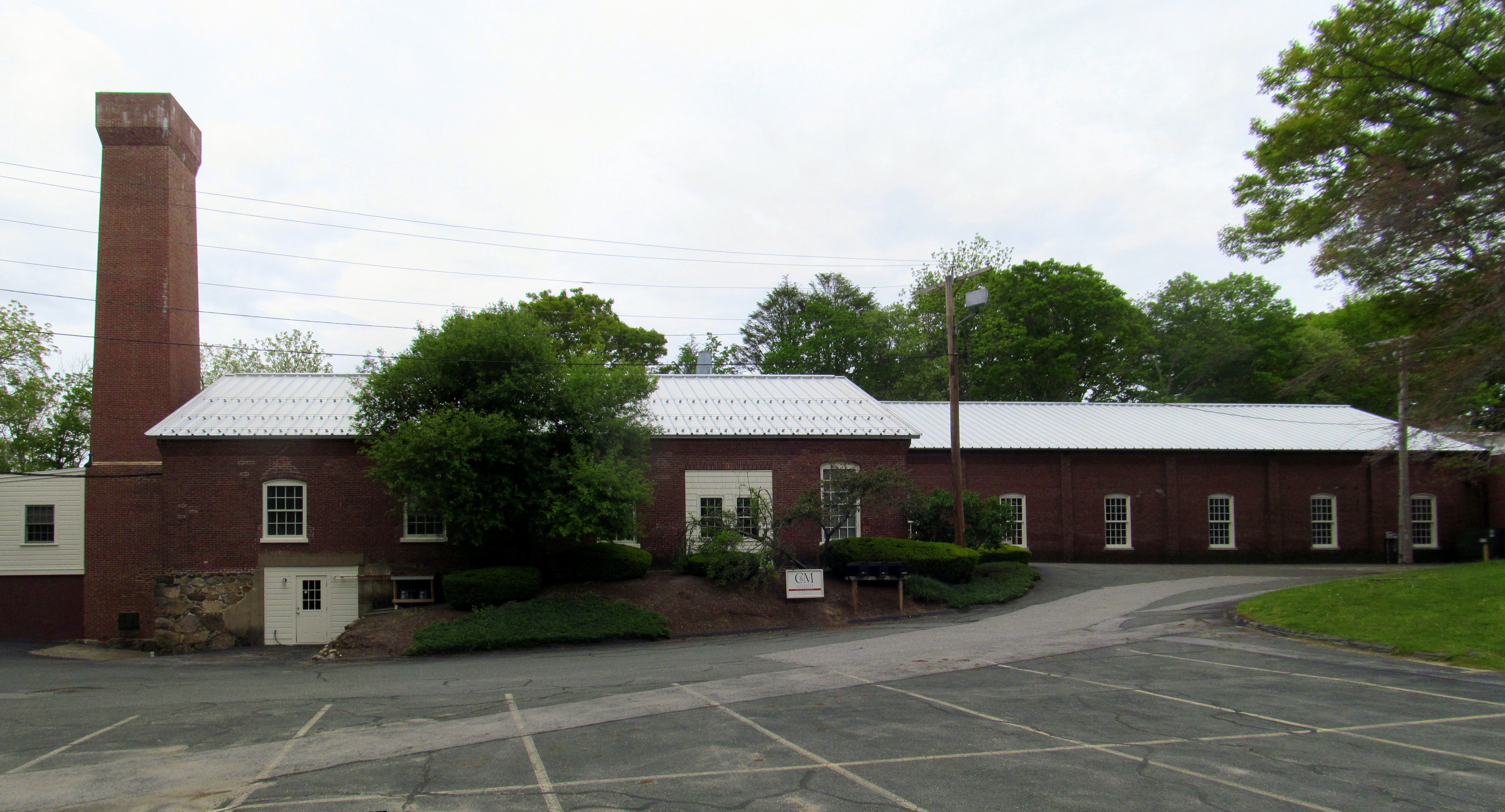
Former powerhouse and carhouse in Essex

The Gloucester, Essex & Beverly operated a trunkline from Beverly to Essex along what is today Massachusetts Route 22 and from Essex to Gloucester along what is today Massachusetts Route 133. There was also a branch line to Ipswich, forking off near Chebacco Lake. In total, the GE&B operated 23 miles (37 km) of track. The mainline and Ipswich branch both ran with 30-minute headways during the summer, and 60-minute headways during the winter.

== Fare structure ==
Fares from Gloucester to West Gloucester and Essex were five cents and ten cents, respectively. The full mainline fare, from Gloucester to Beverly, was 30 cents. Travel along the Ipswich branch cost five cents.
