= Choate House (Massachusetts) =

Historic house in Essex, Massachusetts, US

Coordinates: 42°39′46.27″N 70°45′16.85″W

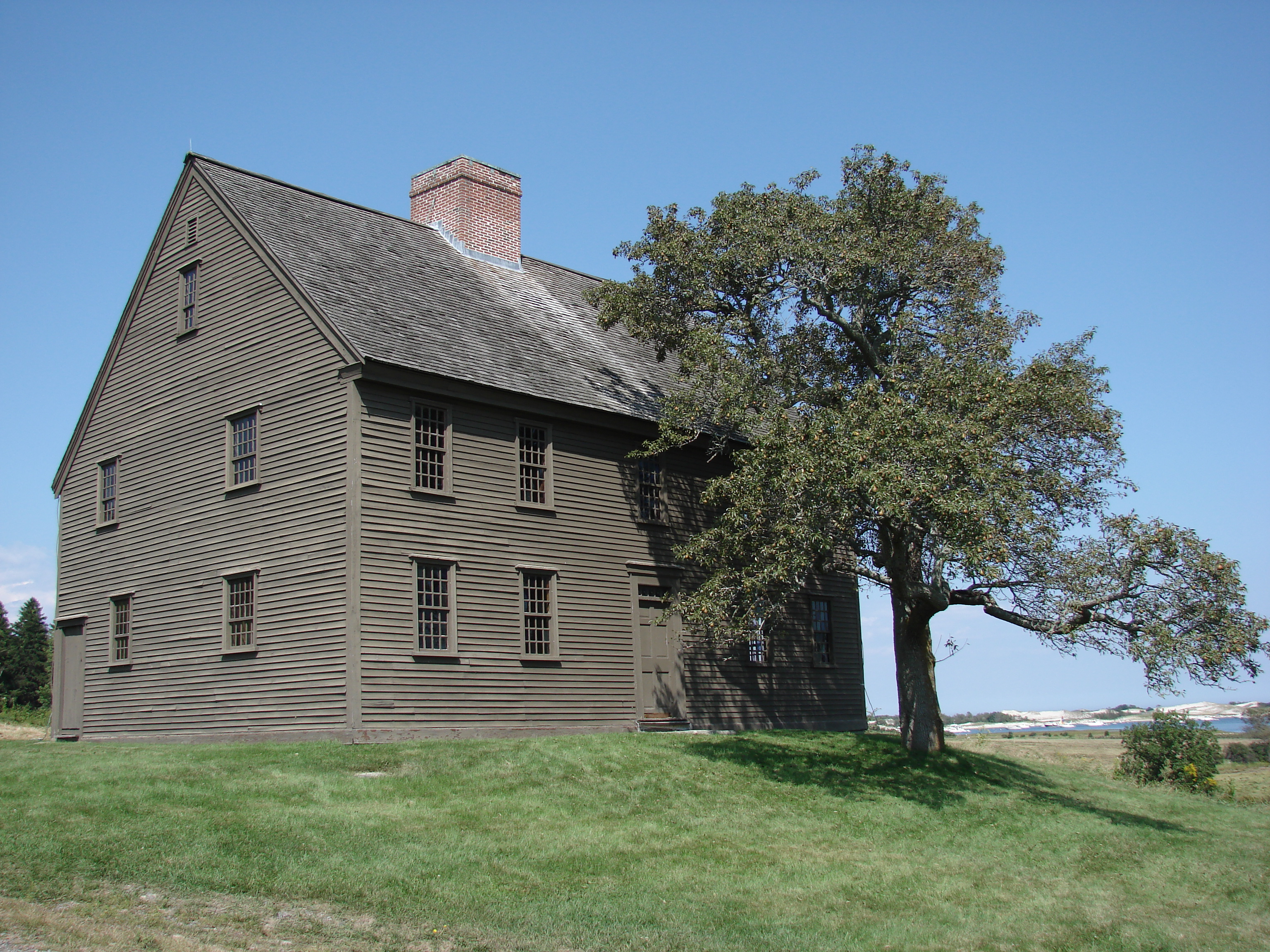
The Choate House

Choate House is a historic house on Choate Island in the Crane Wildlife Refuge, Essex, Massachusetts, owned and administered by the nonprofit Trustees of Reservations.

Choate House, built around 1730, was the birthplace of lawyer and public citizen Rufus Choate (1799–1859), and of his grand-niece, art teacher Agnes Choate, who continued to spend her summers there, into the early 1900s. It has remained virtually unchanged for over two centuries. It stands on Hog Island, also called Choate Island, and is accessible only by boat.
