= Stavros Reservation =

Nature reserve in Essex, Massachusetts, US

Coordinates: 42.6508°N 70.7868°W

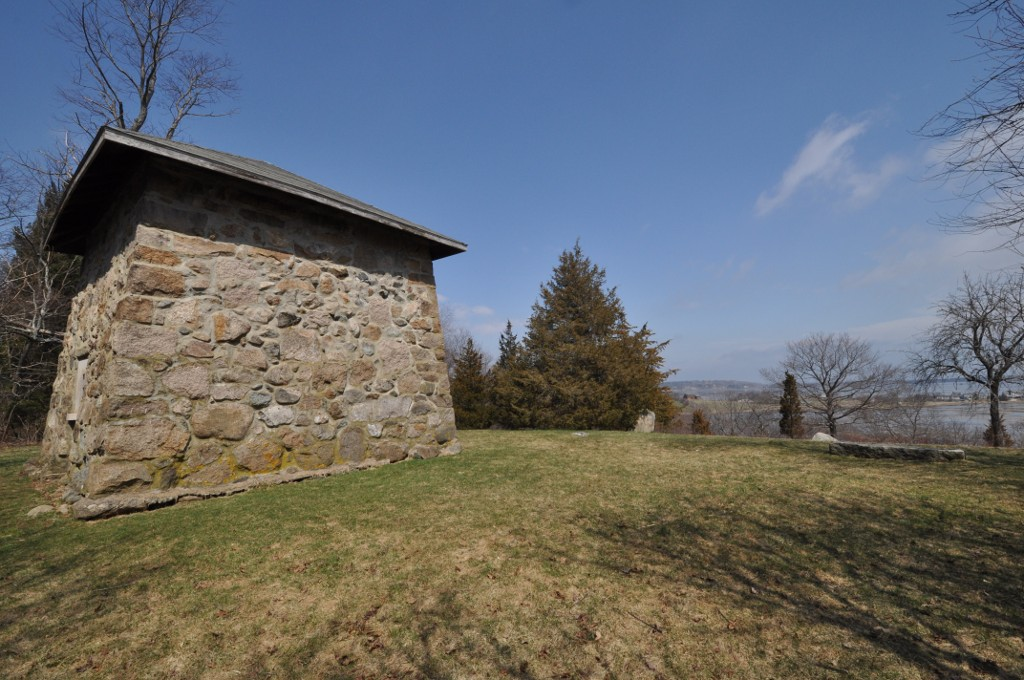
View of Burnham's Tower and the Massachusetts coast

The James N. and Mary F. Stavros Reservation is a 74-acre (30 ha) nature reserve located in Essex, Massachusetts. The property has been owned by The Trustees of Reservations since 1986. About 50 acres (20 ha) of the reservation consists of salt marsh.

White's Hill, which includes fine views of the Massachusetts coast, including Crane Beach, was sold by Mrs. Stavros to the Trustees in 1988 at well below market value. At the top of White's Hill is a 50-foot tall tower built by Lamont G. Burnham in the 1880s.

Much of the adjacent property, including the Cape Ann Golf Course owned by the Stavros family, is covered by conservation easements.
