= Woodman's =

Woodman's may refer to:

- Woodman's Markets a grocery store in Wisconsin and Illinois
- Woodman's of Essex a restaurant in Essex, Massachusetts
