= Choate Island =

Island in Essex, Massachusetts, US

Coordinates: 42°39′53.06″N 70°45′33.47″W

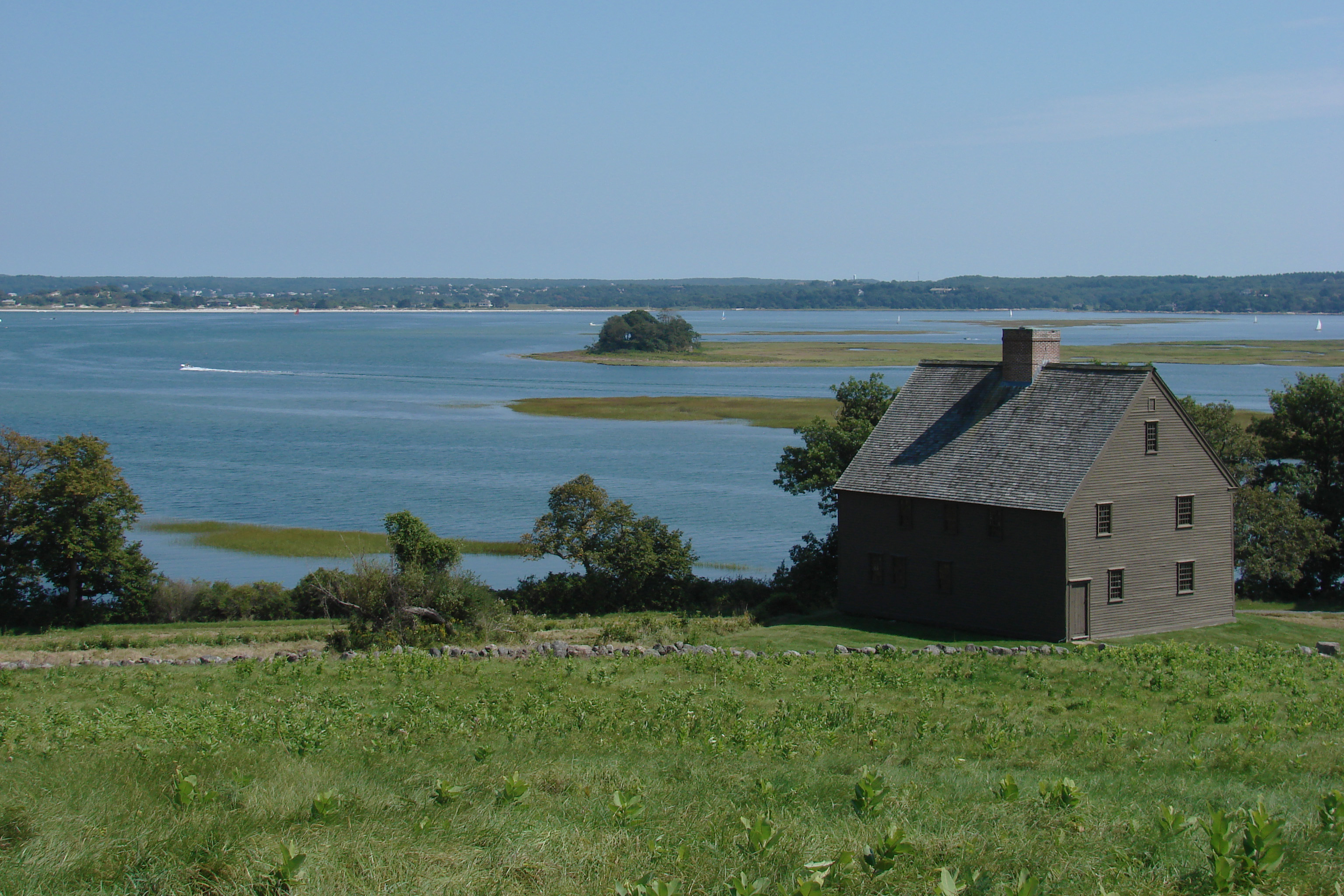
The view from Choate Island with the Choate House in the foreground.

Choate Island, also known as Hog Island, is an island located in the Essex River Estuary in Essex, Massachusetts. It is part of the Crane Wildlife Refuge, which is owned and managed by The Trustees of Reservations. The 135-acre (0.55 km^{2}) island is a refuge for a variety of birds and animals. It is surrounded by a salt marsh and has a spruce forest which was planted in the 1930s and makes the island easily visible from much of the surrounding area. The island has been inhabited by the Native Americans of the area, and was visited by early Europeans, who established farming on the island. The Choate House, built around 1730, remains relatively unchanged.

The island is connected to Long Island, which has a farmhouse and a barn, by a salt marsh and a causeway. There is a dock on Long Island which provides access to Choate Island by boat.

The Crane Wildlife Refuge was established by Miné S. Crane in memory of her husband, Cornelius Crane, and both are buried at the summit of the island.

Much of the 1996 film The Crucible, based on Arthur Miller's play regarding the Salem witch trials, was filmed on the island. Actor Daniel Day-Lewis reportedly spent much time on the island preparing for his role in the film.
