= Evelina M. Goulart =

Fishing schooner

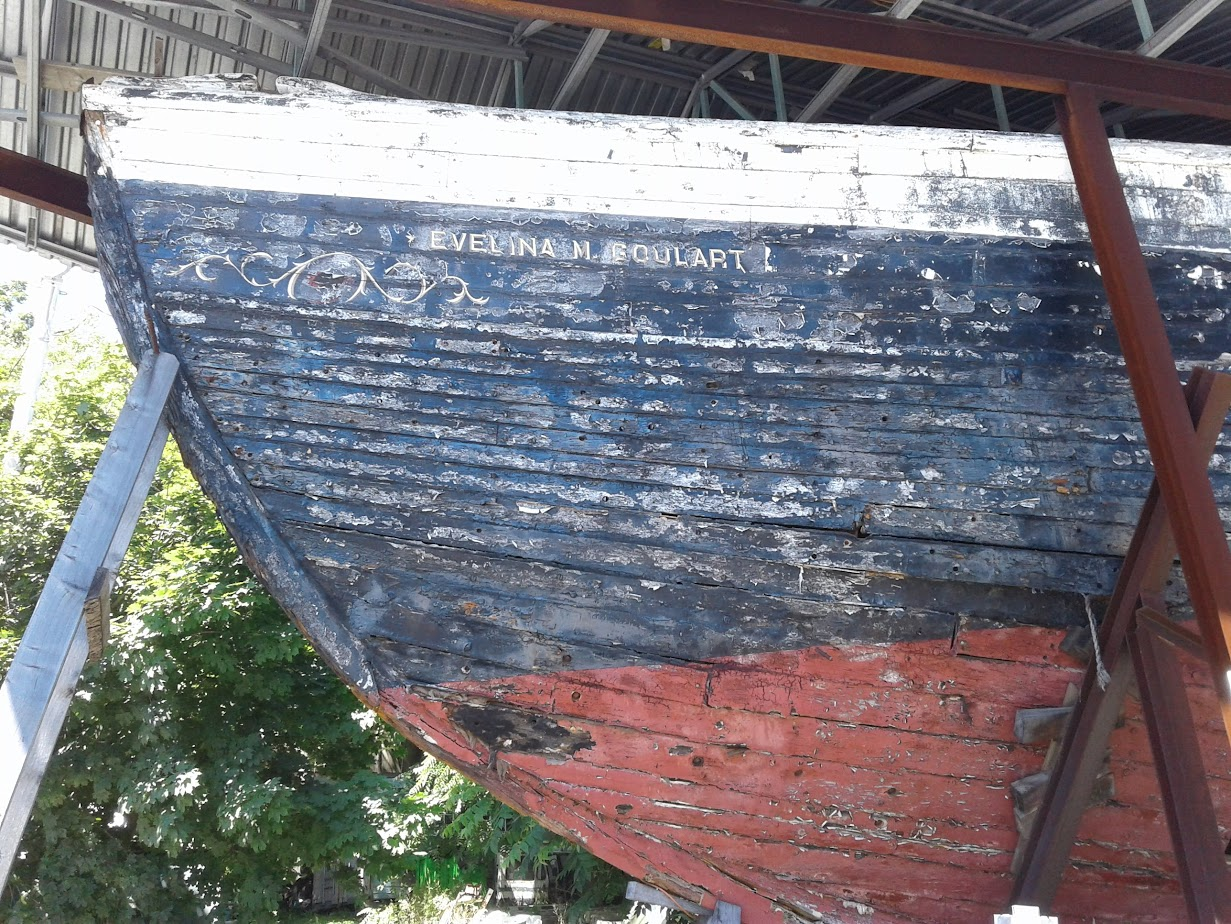
- Bow of the Evelina M. Goulart in 2018

History

United States
- Name: Evelina M. Goulart
- Owner: Essex Historical Society and Shipbuilding Museum
- Launched: 1927
- Status: Museum ship

General characteristics
- Class & type: schooner

The Evelina M. Goulart is an 83-foot (25.2-meter) fishing schooner built by Arthur D. Story in the Story Shipyard (now the Essex Historical Society and Shipbuilding Museum) in 1927. She is one of seven surviving Essex-built fishing schooners and the only one to be virtually unchanged from its original configuration. At some point in her life she was converted into a fishing dragger, being fitted with an engine for the purpose.

Throughout her life she was primarily used for swordfishing. In 1985 Hurricane Gloria touched down in the New England area and damaged the stern of the Goulart. Tied up to the wharf and retired, her engine was removed. At some point the bilge pumps failed and the vessel sank.

In 1990 Evelina M. Goulart was donated to the Essex Shipbuilding Museum. Housed in an open-sided shed, the ship was intended as an example of ship construction, once the ship was stabilized. The vessel was saved once again by private donations, and has been re-stabilized after years of decay.

== See also ==
- List of schooners
