= Fried clams =

New England seafood dish

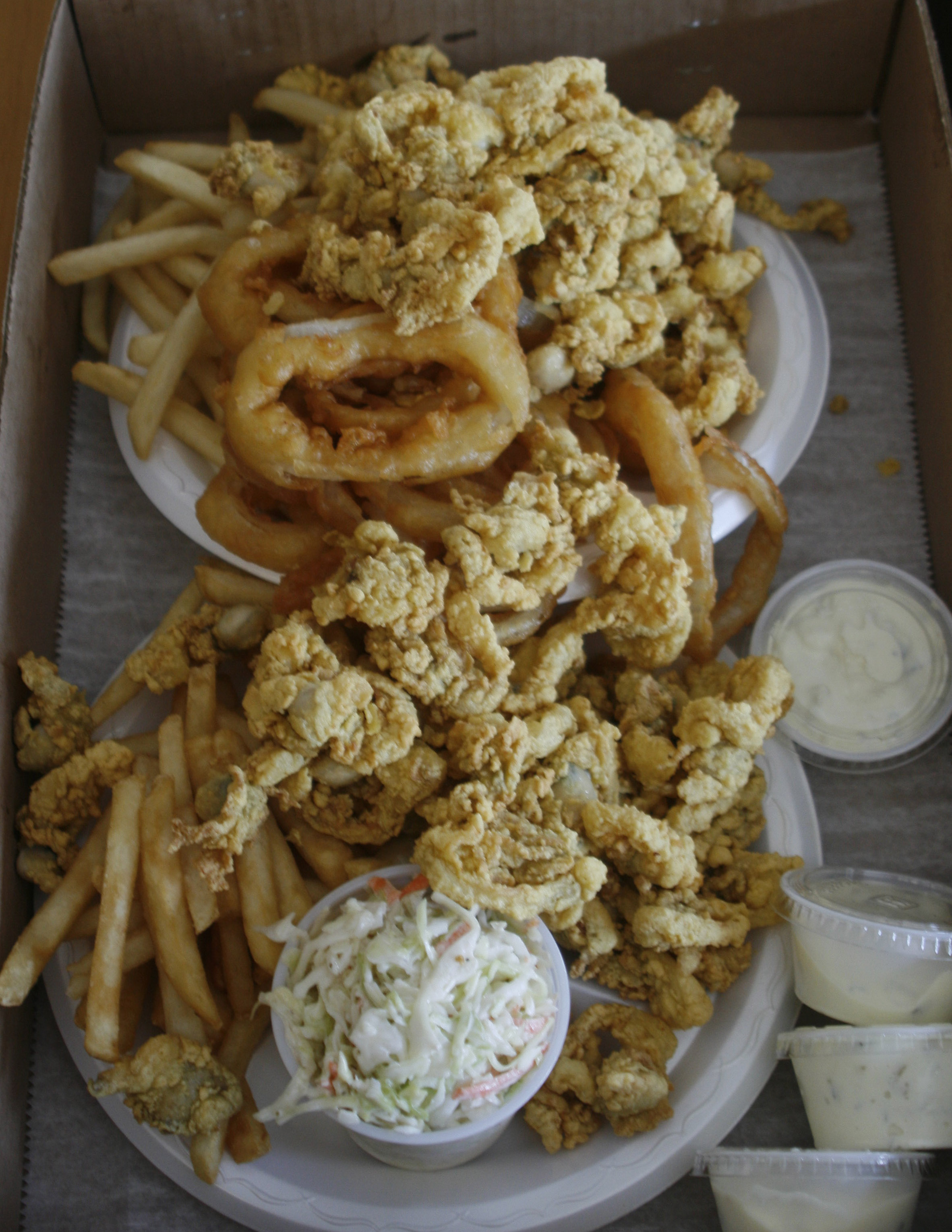
- Fried clams from Woodman's of Essex in Essex, Massachusetts.
- Place of origin: United States
- Region or state: (New England) New England; Atlantic Canada
- Created by: Lawrence "Chubby" Woodman
- Main ingredients: Ipswich clam

Fried clams are clams dipped in milk, floured, and deep-fried.

Fried clams are an iconic food, "to New England, what barbecue is to the South". They tend to be served at seaside clam shacks (roadside restaurants). Clam rolls are fried clams served in a New England–style hot dog bun. They are usually served with Tartar sauce.

Clam strips are the sliced foot of the Atlantic surf clam, served breaded and deep-fried similarly to whole fried clams. Sold frozen and sometime pre-breaded from commercial fisheries, clam strips are more common on menus outside New England.

== Preparation ==
The clams are dipped in evaporated milk, then coated with some combination of regular, corn, and pastry flour. The coated clams are fried in canola oil, soybean oil, or lard.

The usual variant in New England is made from whole soft-shell clams, known as "whole-bellies"; these include the clam's gastrointestinal tract and have a fuller flavor. Some restaurants remove the clam's chewy siphon called the neck.

== History ==
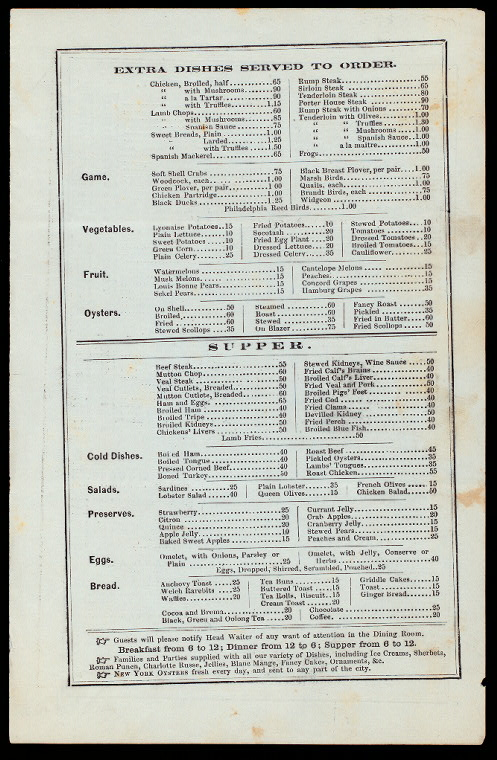
1865 menu with fried clams and oysters

Fried clams are mentioned as early as 1840, and are listed on an 1865 menu from the Parker House hotel. How exactly they were prepared is unclear; the 1865 menu offers both "oysters—fried" and "oysters—fried in batter", but only "fried clams".

Nineteenth-century American cookbooks describe several different dishes of fried clams:

- Seasoned clams sautéed in butter. (1850)
- Clams breaded (with egg binding) and sautéed in butter or fat. (1850) (1904)
- Clams in a beaten egg batter, fried in butter, called "clam fritters". (1850) (1904)

The modern deep-fried, breaded version is generally credited to Lawrence "Chubby" Woodman from Essex, Massachusetts. He is said to have created the first batch on July 3, 1916, in his small roadside restaurant, now Woodman's of Essex. One of his specialties was potato chips, so he had large vats for deep-frying. He used clams he had collected himself from the mud flats of the Essex River, located close to his home.

Later, Thomas Soffron, of Soffron Brothers Clam Co., based in Ipswich, Massachusetts, created clam strips, which are made from the "foot" of hard-shelled sea clams. He sold these to Howard Johnson's in an exclusive deal, and as the chain expanded, they became popular throughout the country.

== Health and dietary considerations ==
Clams in themselves are low in cholesterol and fat, but fried clams absorb cooking fat.
