= Thomas N. Soffron =

- Born: December 10, 1907
- Died: February 21, 2004 (aged 96)

Thomas N. Soffron (December 10, 1907 – February 21, 2004) was the clam digger and restaurateur who created the fried clam strip. He was also a singer and guitarist, member of the Talambekos Mandolinata band.

== Biography ==
He was born on December 10, 1907, and he was an immigrant from Greece with his three brothers and a sister: Virginia Soffron, George N. Soffron (1907–1990), Stephen N. Soffron (1919–1995) and Peter Soffron (1913–1984).

Together they owned the Soffron Brothers Clam Company in Ipswich, Massachusetts, which started in 1938.

They arranged an exclusive deal to provide their clam strips to the Howard Johnson's restaurant chain which were sold under the tradename "Tender-sweet Fried Clams".

There is an anecdote that "Soffron was a picky eater and did not care for the clam's belly. He only ate the strip from the large clam, which he could sanitize." In 1961 they were charged with tax evasion.

He was married to Sophia Economis.
