= Essex Shipbuilding Museum =

Maritime museum in Essex, Massachusetts

Coordinates: 42.6327°N 70.7794°W

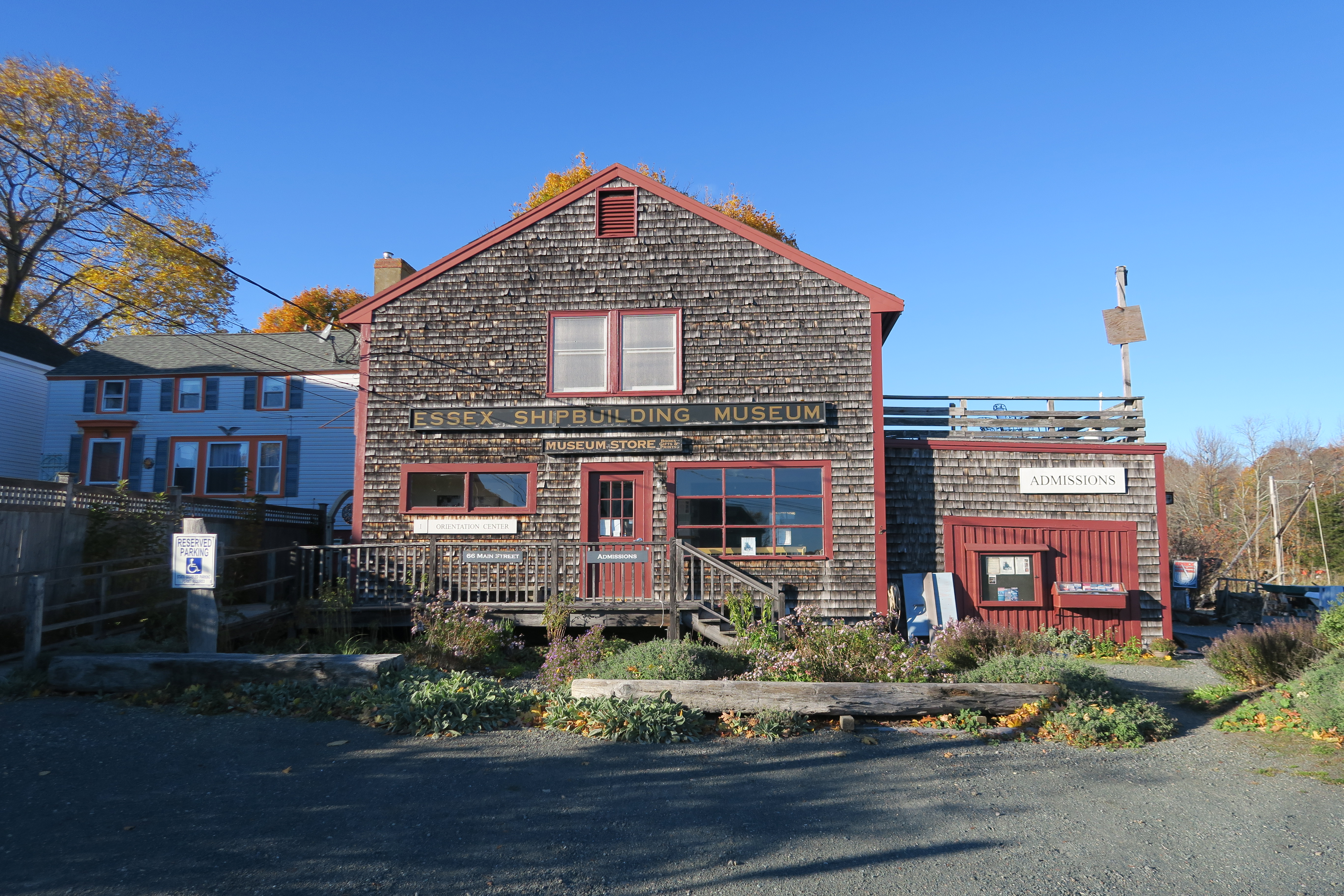
Essex Shipbuilding Museum

The Essex Shipbuilding Museum is a maritime museum in Essex, Massachusetts which contains historical and demonstrative displays regarding the history of the wooden shipbuilding industry in Essex. Essex produced more wooden fishing schooners between 1668 and the twentieth century than anywhere else in America. The museum contains various ship models and half hulls including several on display from the Smithsonian Institution. Displays include antique shipbuilding tools, photos, and dioramas of the former shipyard.

The museum also features the Evelina M. Goulart, an Essex-built schooner built in 1927.

Adjacent to the museum is a boat yard owned by the Story Family, which still constructs and launches wooden ships built in the Essex tradition.

== See also ==
- Category:Ships built in Essex, Massachusetts
- List of maritime museums in the United States
