= John Wise (clergyman) =

American Christian clergy (1652–1725)

John Wise (August 15, 1652 – April 8, 1725) was a Congregationalist reverend and political leader in Massachusetts during the American colonial period. Wise was noted for his political activism, specifically his protests against British taxation, for which he was once jailed. As the pastor of the Chebacco Parish from 1680 to his death in 1725, Wise lived in Ipswich, Massachusetts, often called "the birthplace of American independence."

== Life ==
Wise was born in Roxbury, Massachusetts, the son of Joseph and Mary (Thompson) Wise. Mary was daughter of Alice Freeman Thompson Parke.

He attended the Roxbury Latin School, in West Roxbury, Massachusetts, graduating in 1669. He then was admitted to Harvard College (now Harvard University). After graduating from Harvard in 1673, he began studying theology, and preached in Branford, Connecticut and Hatfield, Massachusetts. On August 12, 1683, Wise was ordained as the pastor of the newly organized Chebacco Parish, a new parish formed out of Ipswich.

In 1688, Wise led Ipswich citizens in a protest against royal governor Edmund Andros and colonial taxation, after the revocation of the Charter of the Massachusetts Bay Company in 1684 which was superseded by the Dominion of New England. Andros took a hard-line position to the effect that the colonists had left behind all their rights as Englishmen when they left England. When in 1687 Wise rallied his parishioners to protest and resist taxation, Andros had him arrested, convicted and fined. As an Andros official explained, "Mr. Wise, you have no more privileges Left you then not to be Sold for Slaves.".

Calvin Coolidge referred to him as one of the inspirations for the Declaration of Independence. John Wise Avenue, a section of Route 133 in Massachusetts, is named after him. Liberty ship SS John Wise, launched on June 14, 1942 and scrapped in 1971, was also named after him.

== Family ==
On December 5, 1678 he married Abigail Gardner, granddaughter of Thomas Gardner (Roxbury). They had seven children:

1. Rev Jeremiah Wise (November 2, 1679 – January 20, 1756) married Mary Shipway
2. Lucy Wise (born c. 1681 – March 5, 1727) married John White
3. John Wise (born c. 1683 – August 31, 1762) married Mary Rogers
4. Mary Wise (May 12, 1685 – March 23, 1735/36)
5. Joseph Wise (February 16, 1686 – September 23, 1745) married Martha Appleton
6. Amni Ruhami Wise (born c. 1688 – July 6, 1749) married Mary Ringe
7. Henry Wise (born c. 1697 – November 12, 1775) married Mary Wade

Through his wife, Rev John was a great-uncle of President John Adams.
