= Crane Wildlife Refuge =

Wildlife refuge in Ipswich and Essex, Massachusetts, USA

Coordinates: 42°40′27″N 70°45′35″W

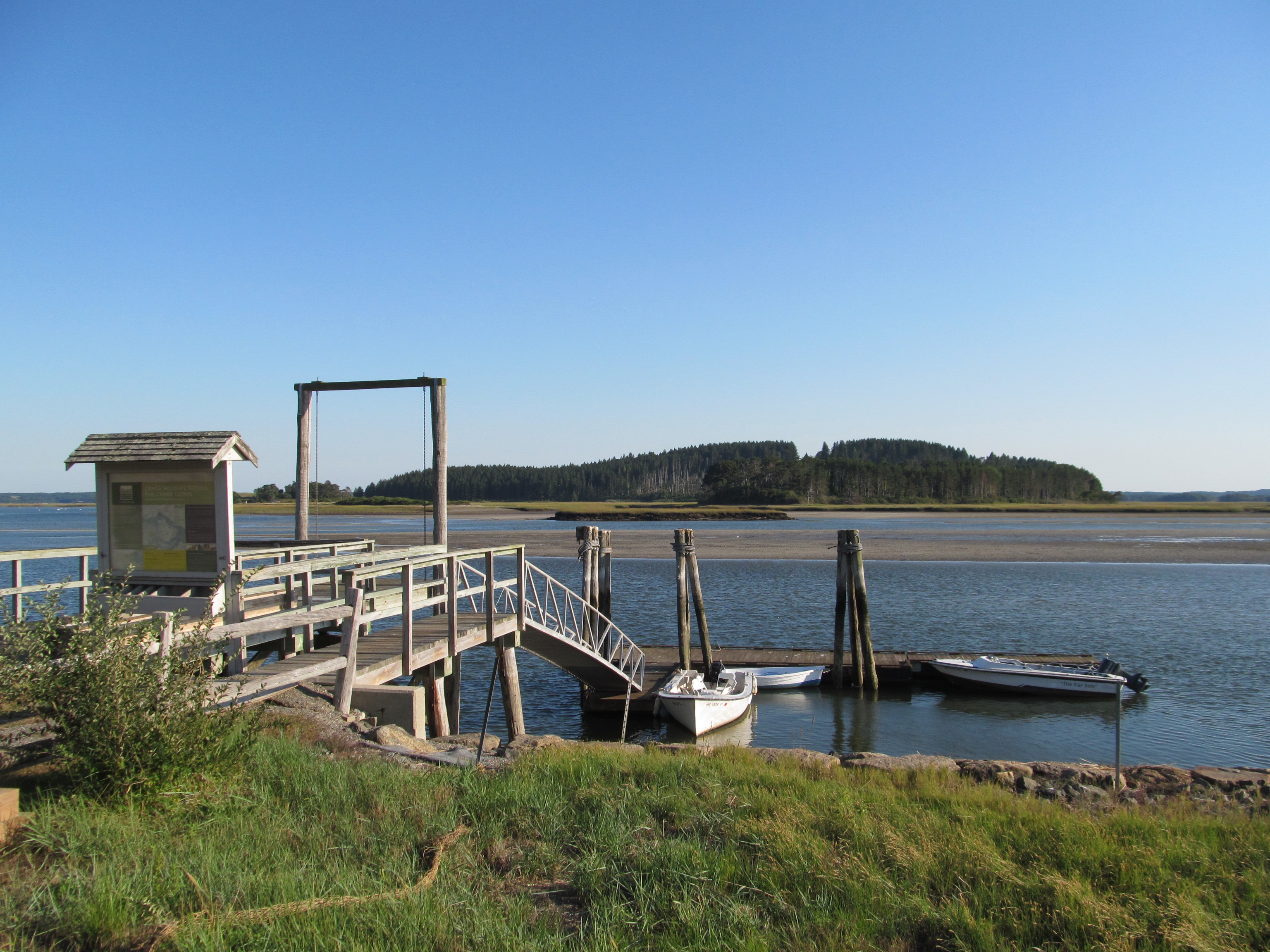
Long Island and Choate Island

The Crane Wildlife Refuge, located in Ipswich and Essex, Massachusetts, is a 674-acre (2.73 km^{2}) property managed by The Trustees of Reservations. The refuge contains Long Island, Choate Island, and small areas of the Great Marsh. Located nearby are Castle Hill and Crane Beach, other properties managed by the Trustees. The three properties together make up the Crane Estate, a property previously owned by Richard T. Crane Jr., son of Richard T. Crane, from 1909 to 1949. The oldest building on the property, the Choate House, dates back to the early 1700s. The refuge was established in 1974.
