= Lawrence Woodman =

Lawrence "Chubby" Woodman was an entrepreneur and restaurant owner credited with inventing fried clams. He and his wife, Bessie, opened Woodman's of Essex on Main Street in Essex, Massachusetts as a clam shack, selling freshly dug steamer clams, ice cream, and homemade potato chips.

Woodman is believed to have invented fried clams on July 3, 1916. According to the company website, a visit from Mr. Tarr, a fisherman from neighboring Gloucester, led to the invention. Woodman acted on Tarr's suggestion to put some clams into the oil used for deep-frying potato chips. After some modifications, such as dipping the clams in evaporated milk and corn flour, the fried clam was created.

Chubby Woodman also mobilized the New England clam bake by using a truck loaded with food, boilers, and wood to bring the clambake to the customer's preferred location. Woodman's restaurant now sells "clambakes to go," which include ingredients such as lobster, clams, potatoes, and corn.

In 2005, Woodman's legacy and his restaurant's focus on clams were impacted by a severe red tide, which tightened clam supplies and increased prices. Consequently, Woodman was forced to import clams from Canada.

== Family and legacy ==
Eventually, Woodman's son, Lawrence Dexter Woodman, known as "Deck," and his wife Virginia, took over the family business. After Deck’s death in 1987, his children and grandchildren founded the L. Dexter Woodman Scholarship Fund. The scholarship provides $20,000 to two local high school seniors for college; applicants are judged on character and community service, in addition to academics, extracurricular activities, and financial needs. Each May, the scholarship fund hosts two fundraising events: the "Taste of Essex," a tasting event featuring local food, and "Deck’s Day for Dubbers," a golf tournament.

== Reputation ==
Woodman's is recognized in travel and restaurant guides, such as Frommer's New England, Frommer's Boston 2006 and Boston 2007, and their Irreverent Guide to Boston. Fodor included the restaurant in their Where to Weekend Around Boston, and the Phantom Gourmet Guide to Boston's Best Restaurants 2008 states it has the best fried clams.
