= Annie Gosbee =

American baseball player

- Second base / Shortstop
- Born: December 29, 1935; Essex, Massachusetts, U.S.
- Died: December 9, 1976 (aged 40); Glendale, California, U.S.
- Batted: Right Threw: Right

Teams
- Grand Rapids Chicks (1953–1954); Rockford Peaches (1954)

Career highlights and awards
- Championship team (1953); All-Star Game (1953); Women in Baseball – AAGPBL Permanent Display at the Baseball Hall of Fame and Museum (unveiled in 1988)

Annie Gosbee (December 29, 1935 – December 9, 1976) was an American infielder who played in the All-American Girls Professional Baseball League (AAGPBL). She batted and threw right handed.

Annie Gosbee played the last two seasons of the All American League with two different clubs and was a member of the 1953 AAGPBL championship team.

A native of Essex, Massachusetts, Annie was one of six children born to Roy and Maude Gosbee. She had two brothers and three sisters. Since an early age, Annie interested in baseball and enjoyed catching for her elder brother Billy, who wanted to be a pitcher and made her his catcher. They would practice regularly after school and whenever school was not in session. Besides, she would play sandlot ball with the local boys after school in a field near the Essex River.

Gosbee attended Rufus Choate Elementary School in Essex, where she played for the school baseball team and was the only girl on it. She also played in the girls’ basketball team for four years, eventually being named its captain in her senior year. At the time, the only organized sport open to women was the rifle team competition, and she excelled at that.

As a teenager, she played second base on the Essex Legion team in the Cape Ann Junior League Conference, becoming just one of two girls to play on junior league baseball teams in the area. Avis Ruth Murray, a member of the Gloucester team, was the other. In addition, Annie extended her talents as an all-around woman in golf, tennis and volleyball.

But Gosbee pursued her love of baseball by playing on a professional league and attended an All American League tryout held in Everett in 1950, even though she did not succeed in her attempt to join the league. Nevertheless, she tried out again in 1953 during her senior year of high school. She then earned money for the trip west to Michigan by washing dishes in a local restaurant before her high school graduation.

In her 1953 yearbook, Gosbee had listed three characteristic interests: to play in the All American League, to own the Boston Red Sox, and Babe Zaharias; a prominent athlete who achieved a great deal of success in golf, basketball, baseball and track and field.

Finally, Gosbee joined the All American League tryout and broke into the Grand Rapids Chicks team roster in 1953. She was used by manager Woody English primarily as a backup at second base for Alma Ziegler. Moreover, she represented her team in the All-Star Game as a shortstop replacement. At the end of the season, Grand Rapids advanced to the playoffs and beat the Rockford Peaches in the best-of-three series first round, 2–1. The Chicks later swept the Kalamazoo Lassies in the final series, 2–0, to win the championship.

Afterwards, Gosbee returned to Essex to complete her high school graduation requirements. In 1954, she split her time between Grand Rapids and Rockford, during what turned out to be the All-American League's final season.

In a 75-game career, Annie posted an average of .136 (16-for-118) with 22 runs scored and seven RBI while stealing one base. She went 0-for-1 in the playoffs. At the field, she recorded 89 putouts with 87 assists and turned 17 double plays, while committing 15 errors in 191 total chances for a combined .922 fielding average.

After the league folded, Gosbee moved to California, where two of her siblings lived. She then attended Los Angeles City College and continued her involvement in sports, while teaching classes and playing nonprofessional basketball. Additionally, she went to work as a library technician in the area.

She died in 1976 in Glendale, California, after being hit by a motorist while trying to cross a street. She was 40 years old.

In 1988, Annie Gosbee received further recognition when she became part of Women in Baseball, a permanent display based at the Baseball Hall of Fame and Museum in Cooperstown, New York which was unveiled to honor the entire All-American Girls Professional Baseball League. She also was inducted posthumously into the Gloucester High School Hall of Fame in Essex, Massachusetts.

== Career statistics ==
Batting

GP	AB	R	H	2B	3B	HR	RBI	SB	TB	BB	SO	BA	OBP	SLG	OPS
75	118	22	16	0	0	0	7	1	16	25	11	.136	.287	.136	.422
