= Essex, Massachusetts =

- Town
- Downtown Essex (2026)

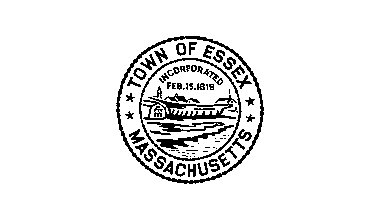
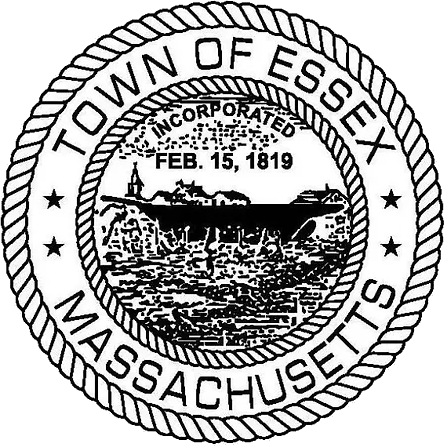
- Flag Seal

- Location in Essex County and the state of Massachusetts.
- Coordinates: 42°37′55″N 70°47′00″W
- Country: United States
- State: Massachusetts
- County: Essex
- Settled: 1634
- Incorporated: 1819

Government
  - Type: Open town meeting

Area
  - Total: 15.9 sq mi (41.3 km^{2})
  - Land: 14.0 sq mi (36.2 km^{2})
  - Water: 2.0 sq mi (5.1 km^{2})
- Elevation: 26 ft (8 m)

Population (2020)
  - Total: 3,675
  - Density: 263/sq mi (102/km^{2})
- Time zone: UTC-5 (Eastern)
  - Summer (DST): UTC-4 (Eastern)
- ZIP code: 01929
- Area code: 351 / 978
- FIPS code: 25-21850
- GNIS feature ID: 0618296
- Website: www.essexma.org

Essex is a coastal town in Essex County, Massachusetts, United States, 26 miles (42 km) north of Boston and 13 miles (21 km) southeast of Newburyport. It is known for its former role as a center of shipbuilding. The population was 3,675 at the 2020 census.

The central village areas of Essex and South Essex make up the census-designated place of Essex.

== History ==
Essex was incorporated as a town in 1819. It was previously a part of the town of Ipswich and was then called Chebacco Parish. The first European settlers arrived in 1634. At that time, the land formed part of an area inhabited by Native Americans of the Agawam tribe. The name Chebacco is Agawam in origin and refers to a large lake whose waters extend into neighboring Hamilton. Conomo Point, the easternmost part of the town, is named for the Sagamore or Chief of the Agawams, Masconomo, the leader of the tribe in the late 17th century. Early on, Chebacco Parish lobbied for status as an independent town, asking for permission to build a meeting house. In colonial times, the existence of a meeting house in a settlement conferred de facto autonomy, so Chebacco Parish was denied permission to build such a structure. Popular history tells that one written dictate was issued stating that "no man shall raise a meeting house", so the residents of the settlement interpreted it as to mean that women would be allowed to do so. It is reported that a local woman, Madam Varney, assembled the town's women and construction of a meeting house was carried out by them while the men looked on. Jeremiah Shepard was a minister at the church in Chebacco Parish from 1678 to 1680. He was succeeded by John Wise, who was pastor of Chebacco Parish from 1680 to his death in 1725.

== Geography and transportation ==
According to the United States Census Bureau, the town has a total area of 15.9 square miles (41.3 km^{2}), of which 14.0 square miles (36.2 km^{2}) is land and 2.0 square miles (5.1 km^{2}), or 12.41%, is water. The town does not have any direct access to Ipswich Bay and the Atlantic Ocean, with Essex Bay providing access through the northeast corner of town (the eastern half of the bay lies within Ipswich and Gloucester, with all of the outlet nominally belonging to Gloucester). The central part of Essex lies on marshland surrounding the Essex River. This is a portion of the larger Great Marsh, a salt marsh that defines the geography of the coasts of much of northeastern Massachusetts and southern New Hampshire and which also provides a habitat for the clams that are an important and famous staple of the local cuisine. The Essex River feeds Essex Bay, along with Castle Neck River (which provides most of the town's border with Ipswich) and several creeks, including Walker Creek, Hardys Creek and Soginese Creek. The land that makes up the limits of the town is close to sea level, with a few low hills dotting the landscape. Chebacco Lake and the surrounding wetlands make up most of the southwestern part of the town. Essex's population has increased at a sustainable rate over the last quarter century, so it still maintains a certain rural quality with abundant forested areas, wetlands and open spaces. There are several protected areas within town, including the Allyn-Cox Reservation, a portion of Crane Wildlife Refuge, the Stavros Reservation and the state Wildlife Management Area. The Crane Wildlife Refuge covers several of the islands in Essex Bay, including Choate Island.

Essex is bordered by Hamilton to the west, Manchester-by-the-Sea to the south, Gloucester to the east, and Ipswich to the north. Essex is located 11 miles (18 km) northeast of Salem and 33 miles (53 km) northeast of Boston. Though not accessible directly by a major highway, Route 128 clips the corner of town, with exits located in neighboring Manchester-by-the-Sea and Gloucester. Route 133 passes from northwest to southeast through town, and the eastern end of Route 22 is at Route 133 in the center of town. The Ipswich Essex Explorer bus provides weekend service during the summer connecting with the MBTA Commuter Rail at Ipswich along the Newburyport/Rockport Line, as well as providing service to Crane Beach and other nearby attractions. The Rockport portion of the commuter rail line passes through neighboring Manchester-by-the-Sea and Gloucester.

== Demographics ==
Historical population
Year	Pop.	±%
1850	1,585	—
1860	1,701	+7.3%
1870	1,014	−40.4%
1880	1,670	+64.7%
1890	1,713	+2.6%
1900	1,663	−2.9%
1910	1,621	−2.5%
1920	1,478	−8.8%
1930	1,465	−0.9%
1940	1,384	−5.5%
1950	1,794	+29.6%
1960	2,238	+24.7%
1970	2,670	+19.3%
1980	2,998	+12.3%
1990	3,260	+8.7%
2000	3,267	+0.2%
2010	3,504	+7.3%
2020	3,675	+4.9%
2022*	3,668	−0.2%
* = population estimate. Source: United States census records and Population Estimates Program data.

As of the census of 2000, there were 3,267 people, 1,313 households, and 887 families residing in the town. The population density was 230.7 inhabitants per square mile (89.1/km^{2}). There were 1,446 housing units at an average density of 39.4 persons/km^{2} (102.1 persons/sq mi). The racial makeup of the town was 98.50% White, 0.15% African American, 0.12% Native American, 0.43% Asian, 0.03% Pacific Islander, 0.21% from other races, and 0.55% from two or more races. Hispanic or Latino of any race were 0.92% of the population.

There were 1,313 households, out of which 31.5% had children under the age of 18 living with them, 56.1% were married couples living together, 7.8% have a woman whose husband does not live with her, and 32.4% were non-families. 26.7% of all households were made up of individuals, and 9.4% had someone living alone who was 65 years of age or older. The average household size was 2.49 and the average family size was 3.03.

In the town, the population was spread out, with 24.2% under the age of 18, 5.3% from 18 to 24, 30.1% from 25 to 44, 26.9% from 45 to 64, and 13.6% who were 65 years of age or older. The median age was 40 years. For every 100 females, there were 96.7 males. For every 100 females age 18 and over, there were 97.4 males.

The median income for a household in the town was $59,554, and the median income for a family was $70,152. Males had a median income of $48,036 versus $32,000 for females. The per capita income for the town was $31,613. 6.6% of the population and 4.3% of families were below the poverty line. Out of the total people living in poverty, 6.1% are under the age of 18 and 10.8% are 65 or older.

== Government ==
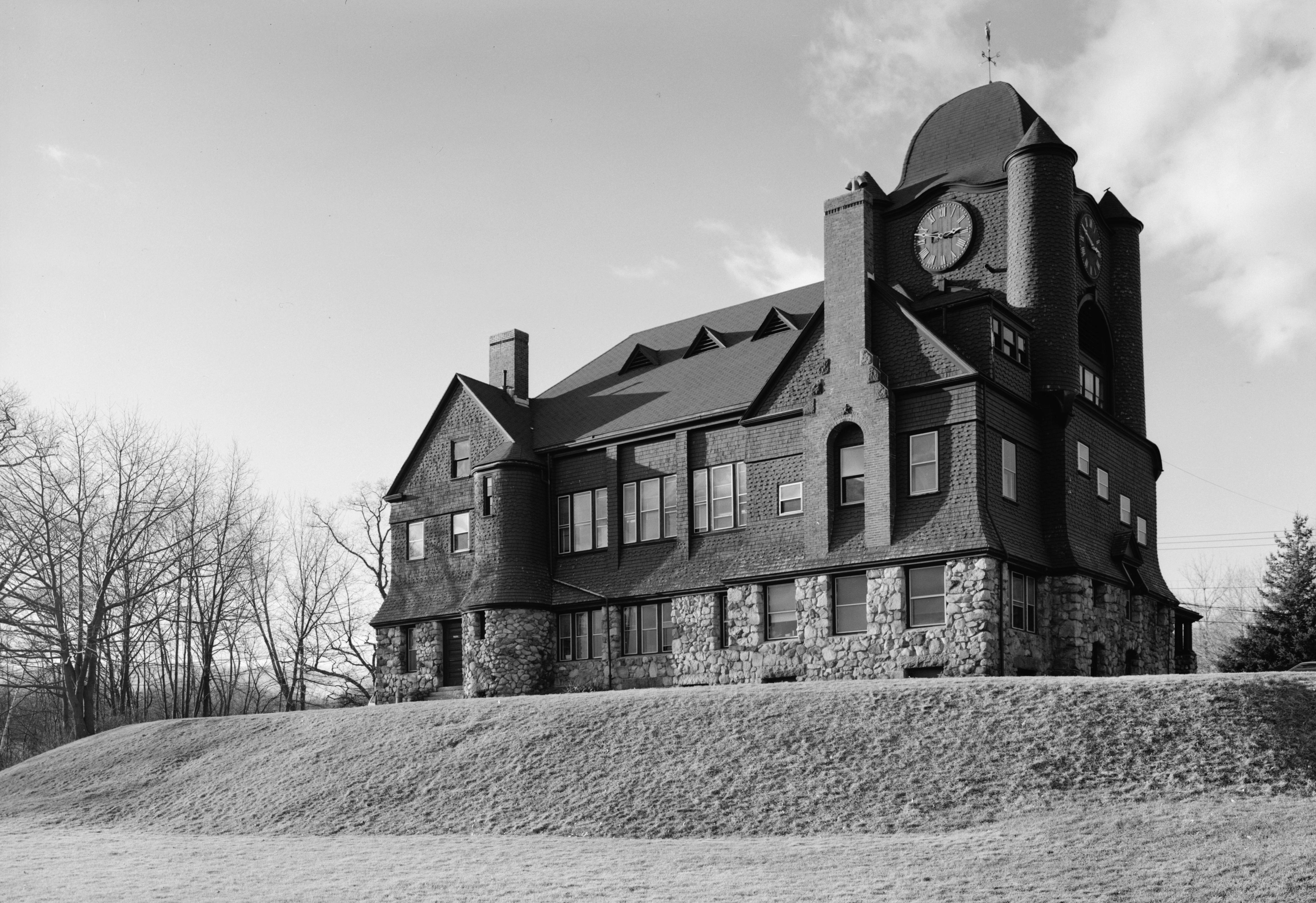
Essex Town Hall and TOHP Burnham Library (built 1893–1894)

Essex's municipal offices are housed in the Essex Town Hall and TOHP Burnham Library, an exuberant Shingle Style building erected in 1893–1894.

Essex's small size makes New England's traditional direct-democracy style of government practical. The residents of Essex elect a board of three selectmen to carry out the routine business of local government while relying on the town meeting system to decide major issues. In recent years, the most important of these issues has been the leasing of public lands at Conomo Point, a school regionalization plan with Manchester-by-the-Sea, and the construction of infrastructure for dealing with sewerage.

In 2002 the town hired a Town Administrator to work for the board of selectmen and oversee day-to-day operations. Policy and major decisions are still verified by the town meeting.

== Education ==
The community lies within the Manchester Essex Regional School District.

Essex has one public school, Essex Elementary School, that offers instruction to children from pre-kindergarten to grade 5. The Essex Middle School had previously functioned to educate students to grade 8. But recent regionalization has brought the Essex Middle School children into the Manchester Essex Regional Middle School, located in the same building as both the Manchester Essex Regional High School and the previous Manchester Middle School.

The town of Essex does not include a high school, and in years past has had to send its grade 9 through 12 students to neighboring districts. Arrangements in the past have included sending high school students to Manchester-by-the-Sea, Gloucester and Hamilton-Wenham public schools. In 2000, the town approved a plan to create a regional school district with Manchester-by-the-Sea. Under the plan, the two towns are served by a consolidated school system, the "Manchester-Essex Schools", and a new high school. This marks the first time Essex did not have to send its students to another district to attend high school.

In early 2006, the voters of both Essex and Manchester by the Sea approved a new $49 million regional school project for the purpose of building a new Middle School and High School. Both projects were approved at Town Meeting and then again at the ballot box for a debt-exclusion which will permit the towns to raise funds in excess of the 2.5% property tax cap mandated by Prop. 2.5. A similar $36 million plan three years earlier was defeated in Essex at the polls and approved in Manchester. Construction was completed in the summer of 2009, and students began attending the new middle-high school in the fall of 2009.

== Economy ==
=== Seafood, tourism and antiques ===
The main sources of income for the town of Essex are the shellfish industry and tourism. The fried clam recipe was reportedly invented in Essex by clam shack owner Chubby Woodman during the summer of 1916 after a visiting friend suggested he dip a clam in a fryer. Due to the quality of the clams that reside in the tidal river in Essex, local restaurants thrive by preparing it along with other types of seafood. In Essex as well as other neighboring towns, clambakes have thus proved a well-liked summer feast for locals and visitors alike. Tourists are mainly drawn to Essex for its restaurants, but leisure activities, such as excursions down the Essex River in boats or self-guided kayak trips, have also become popular. One disadvantage that Essex has is that its only beach is not easily accessible by land and, as such, is not a major draw for tourists, as are the beaches of neighboring Gloucester, Ipswich and Manchester-by-the-Sea. Essex also competes with nearby Rockport for tourists in search of "New England charm". In the last few decades, there has also emerged an antiques trade in Essex. The town now claims one of the highest density of antique shops of any town in the United States.

=== Former shipbuilding center ===
The town of Essex was once home to a prosperous shipbuilding trade. This industry accounted for most of the revenue of the town from the days of its settlement as Chebacco Parish until the early part of the 20th century. Once a leading supplier of schooners for Gloucester and other Atlantic fishing communities, Essex did not adapt to the transition from sail-powered wooden ships to engine-powered metal vessels, and this activity disappeared around World War II. There have been recent attempts to return to shipbuilding on a small scale as a tourist attraction and they have met with some success. The Essex Shipbuilding Museum stands as a living testament to the wooden shipbuilding industry and the neighboring boat yard owned by generations of the Story Family still constructs and launches classic wooden ships built in the Essex tradition.

== Culture ==
There are several active youth sports teams, as well as other youth organizations, such as the Boy Scouts of America and Girl Scouts of the USA.

Since 1994 the Essex Music Festival, offering bluegrass, blues, folk, maritime, and Celtic music, had been held at Centennial Grove at Chebacco Lake in Essex. The festival was called off in 2009 due to Tropical Storm Danny, but it resumed the following year; another hurricane resulted in the cancellation of the 2011 festival, and it was never held again.

Much of the film Grown Ups, filmed in the summer of 2009, used Centennial Grove at Chebacco Lake for filming.

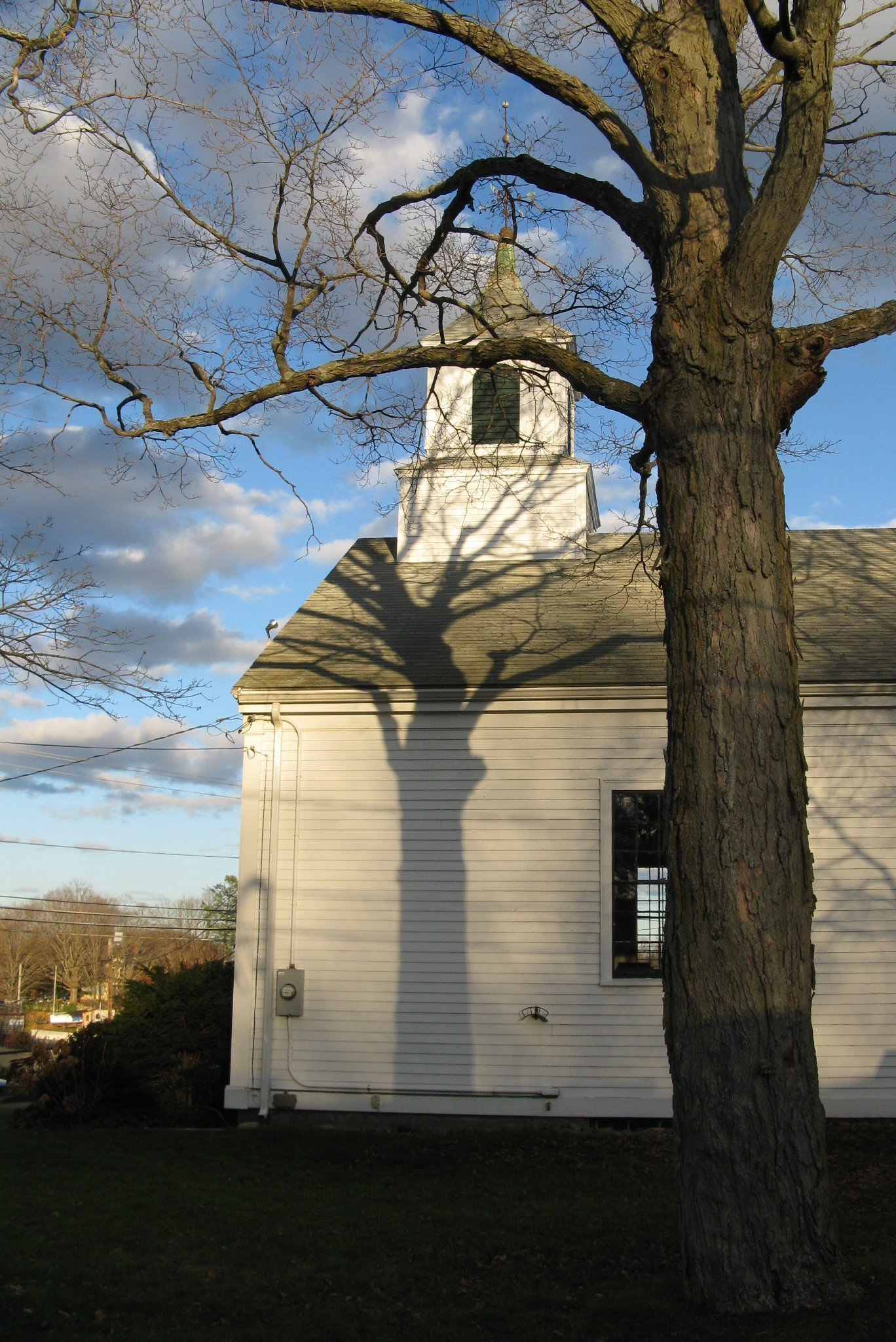
First Universalist Church

== Religion ==
Essex has several churches of various Protestant Christian denominations (Unitarian Universalist, Congregational, Evangelical, Bible church) as well as a Roman Catholic parish.

== Conomo Point ==
Conomo is a summer community that is over 100 years old. There are 104 seasonal cottages and year-round homes on Conomo Point, a summer colony on town-leased land. In 1819, Essex separated from the town of Ipswich on the condition that Essex would take care of their poor. To fulfill this agreement, the town of Essex found four properties ideal for a Poor Farm or Alms House in 1825. Since these waterfront properties were not good for shipyards, dry fishing, and farming, these properties had very little value.

From the time from 1850 to 1900, attitudes toward waterfront property changed. This was due partly to the shortening of the work week and the expanding middle class. The town voted to allow "leasing of rights to build shanties on Town Farm Road." Then, another group of shanties were established on Robbin's Island. Conomo Point was no longer populated by only by Essex citizens by 1900. Due to the construction of the railroad in Essex in 1892, Conomo Point was far more accessible to people from nearby towns.

Since the beginning, Conomo Point residents had paid real estate taxes on the land they rented, as well as personal taxes on their cottages. The town of Essex expected to profit from its land. The rents were increased by 25% in 1927 by vote in a town meeting. In 1951, rents were increased another 5%. Then in 1961, rents were raised even higher by 25%.

From 1950 to 1970, the town of Essex sought to maximize its rental income, while at the same time avoided increasing rental rates, resulting in rapid growth of the Point. Over these years, the town of Essex approved new lots to be leased for the sake of cottage construction.

By the late 1940s, the water supplied to Conomo Point from Essex began getting rusty and turbid due to aging pipelines. After years of suffering poor water quality, in the mid-1970s Conomo residents began drilling private wells. Because the water lines to the Point had until then been turned off in October for the duration of the winter, year-round living there had not been a consideration, and Conomo Point Commissioners were reluctant to grant permission to drill wells. In response, the Board of Health ruled that no more cottages at the Point could be converted from seasonal to year-round use after May 1982.

== Points of interest ==
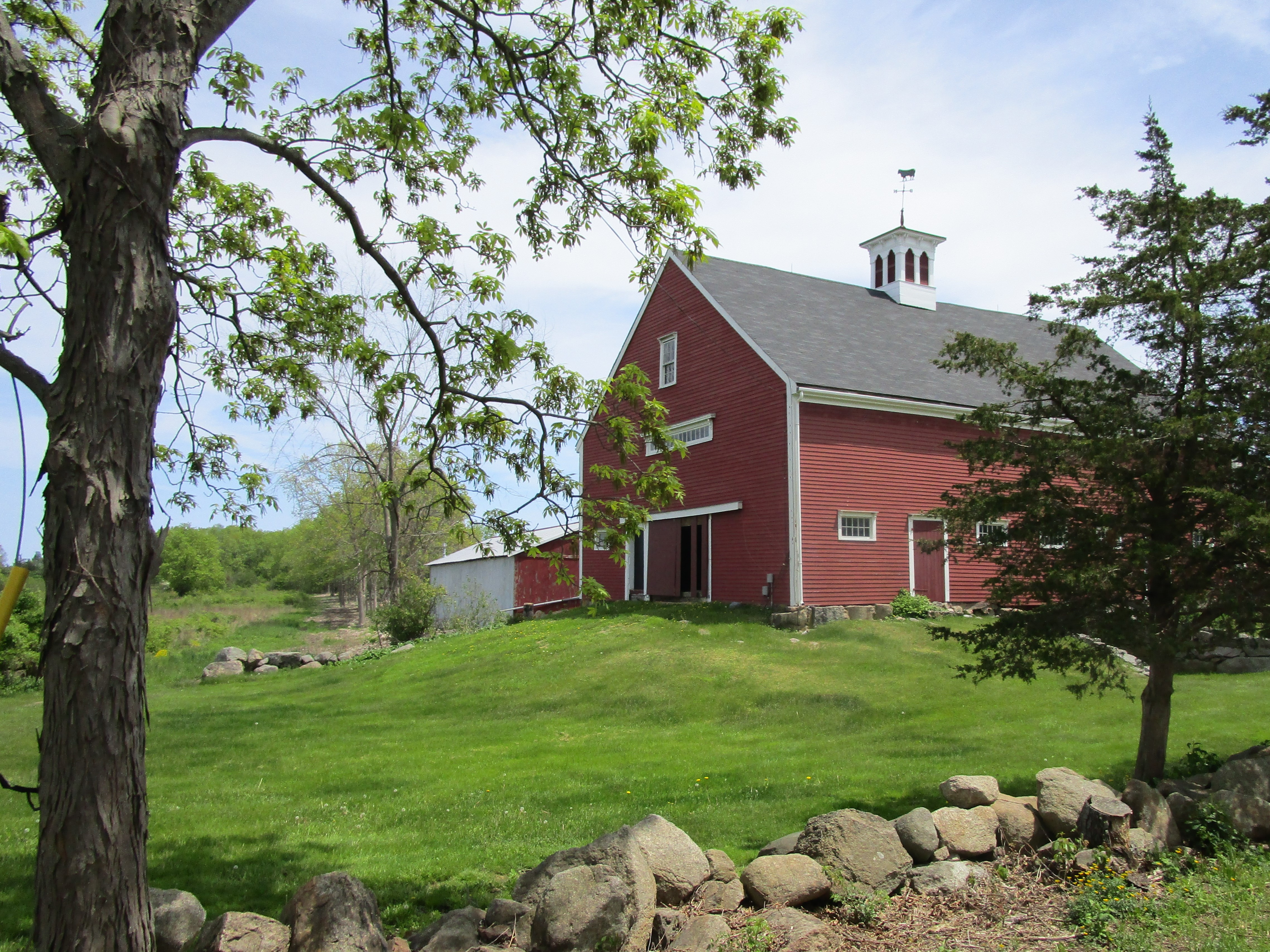

- Chebacco Lake
- Choate House, birthplace of Rufus Choate
- Cogswell's Grant, c. 1728
- Conomo Point
- Cox Reservation – Essex County Greenbelt Association conservation Land
- Crane Wildlife Refuge
- Essex Shipbuilding Museum
- Essex Town Hall and TOHP Burnham Library
- First Congregational Church on Main Street; meetinghouse built 1792. A bell cast by Paul Revere in 1797 hangs in the belfry.
- Stavros Reservation
- Woodman's of Essex

== Film references ==
In 1995, the feature film The Crucible, starring Winona Ryder and Daniel Day-Lewis, was filmed in Essex. Winona Ryder stayed in a private home on Western Avenue during the filming of The Crucible.

Grown Ups, starring Adam Sandler, was filmed in Essex during the summer of 2009, primarily at Chebacco Lake. The movie also shot at Woodman's restaurant in Essex; in Southborough, Massachusetts; and at Water Wizz in Wareham, Massachusetts.

== Notable people ==
- Joseph Brain (born 1940), physiologist and environmental health researcher (B)
- Rufus Choate (1799–1859), lawyer, orator, United States congressman, senator. A close friend of Daniel Webster, Choate was chosen to serve out his unfinished term in the United States Senate. Choate is considered today to be one of the fathers of traditional American conservatism. Choate Street, named after the Choate family, connects John Wise Ave to Chebacco Road
- Evan Dando, founder and frontman of the alternative rock band The Lemonheads, is an Essex native
- Benn Ferriero, NHL player born and raised in Essex
- Michael Gerald Ford (born 1950), eldest son of U.S. President Gerald Ford, lived in Essex at the same time his father occupied the White House. Ford made Essex his home while studying at nearby Gordon–Conwell Theological Seminary
- Annie Gosbee (1935–1976), All-American Girls Professional Baseball League player and all-around athlete, born and raised in Essex
- Jonathan Knight, member of 1980s–1990s boy band New Kids on the Block and later host of the HGTV television show Farmhouse Fixer, in which he restores old New England farmhouses
- Augustus Gardner Means (1925–1994), member of the Massachusetts House of Representatives and Massachusetts Governor's Council and recipient of the Distinguished Service Cross from the United States Army
- John Wise (1652–1725), pastor of Chebacco Parish (when this parish remained part of the neighboring town of Ipswich), who spoke out against "taxation without representation" more than a half century before the American Revolutionary War. A section of Massachusetts Route 133, John Wise Avenue, is named after him
- Lawrence "Chubby" Woodman, owner of Woodman's of Essex who is said to have invented the fried clam
