= Chebacco Lake =

Lake in Massachusetts, US

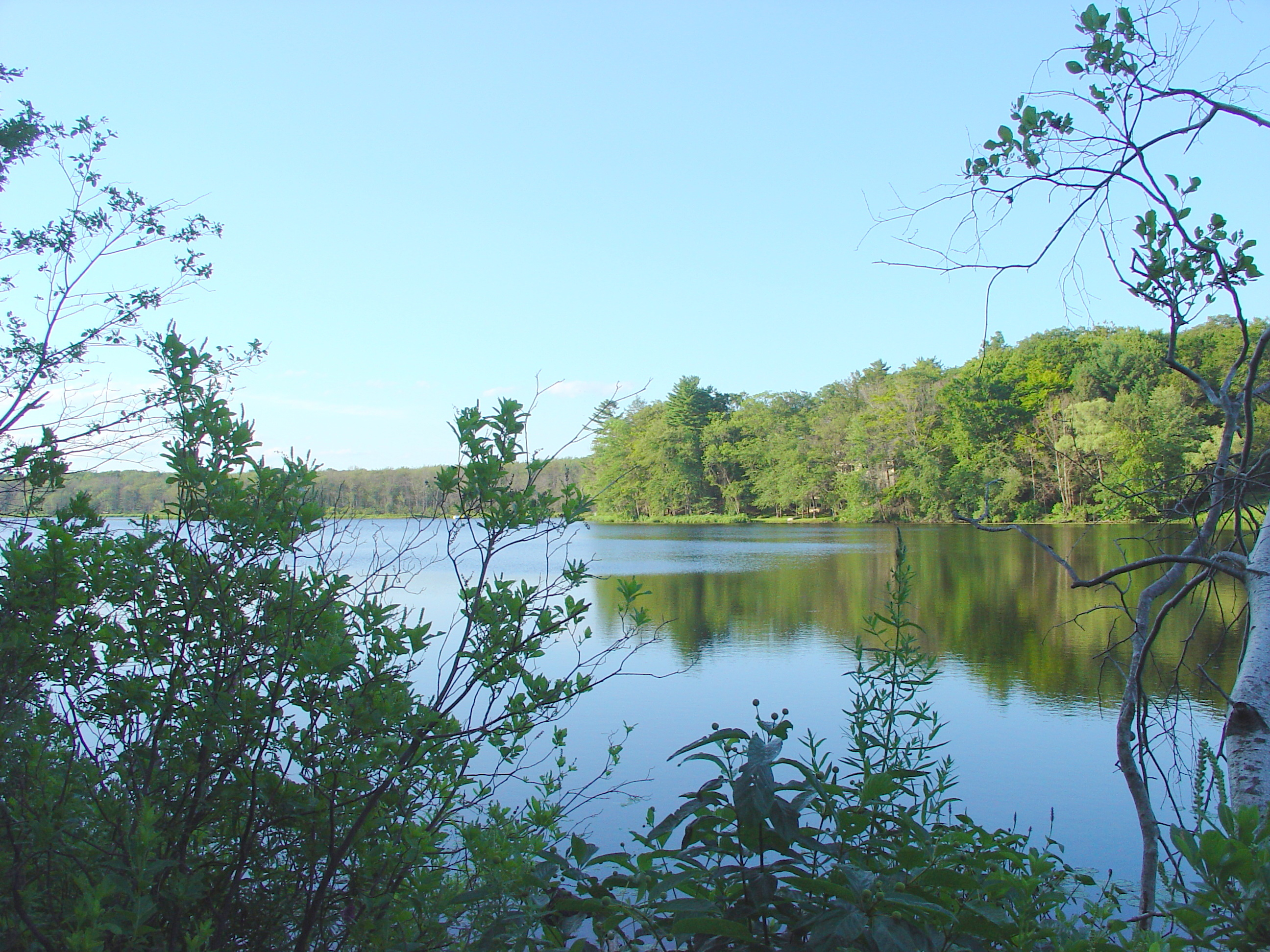
- Photo of Chebacco Lake

- Location in Massachusetts Chebacco Lake (the United States)

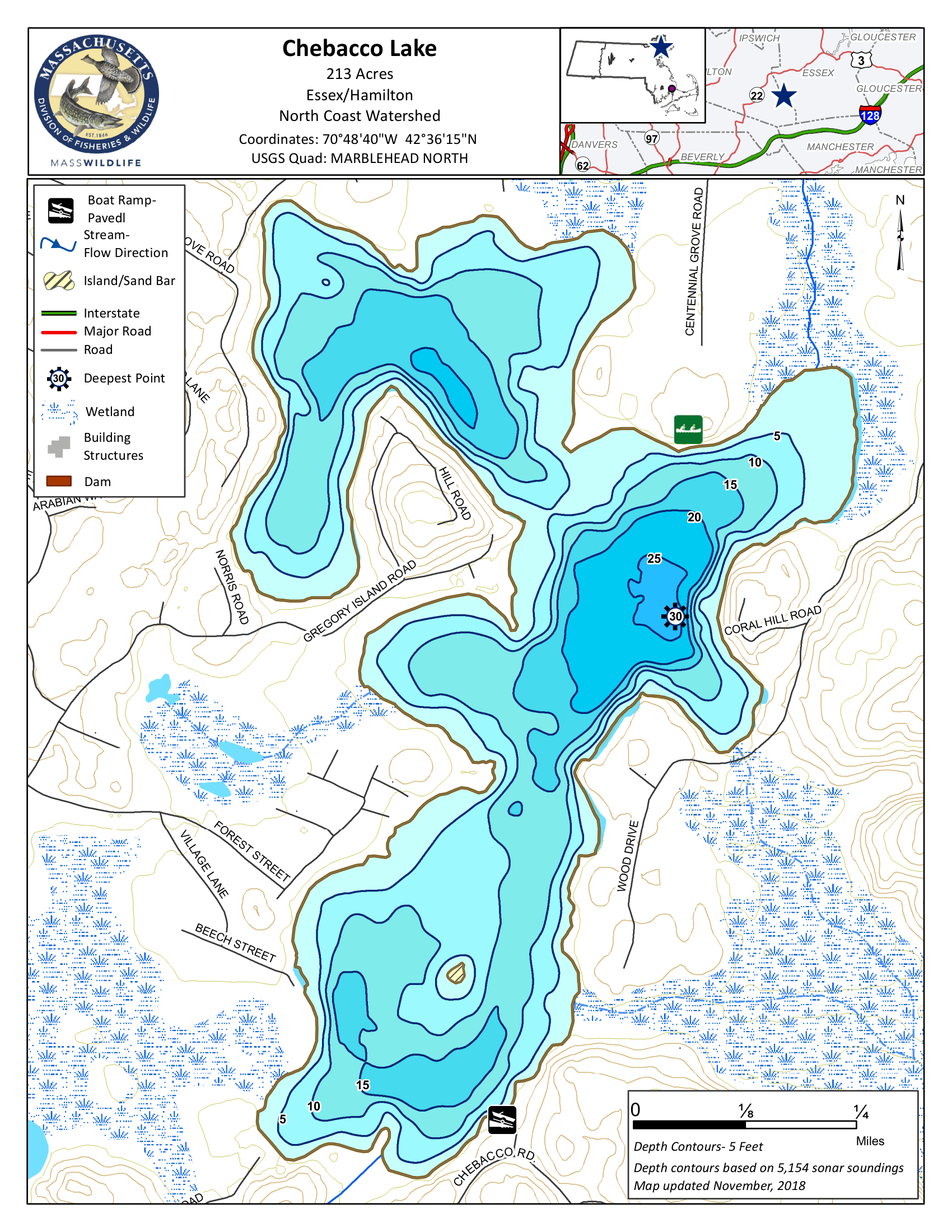
- Bathymetric map of Chebacco Lake showing 5-foot depth contours based on 5,154 sonar soundings
- Location: Essex County, Massachusetts
- Coordinates: 42°36′41″N 70°48′40″W
- Lake type: Glacial, Great Pond
- Primary inflows: Five connected tributary ponds, a sand-gravel aquifer, and widespread seasonal stormwater runoff
- Primary outflows: Alewife Brook
- Catchment area: 7.2 sq mi (19 km^{2})
- Basin countries: United States
- Surface area: 209 acres (0.85 km^{2})
- Average depth: 9 ft (2.7 m)
- Max. depth: 22 ft (6.7 m)
- Surface elevation: 43 ft (13 m)
- Islands: 1
- Settlements: Essex, Hamilton
- Website: chebaccolake.org

Chebacco Lake is a freshwater lake in Essex County, Massachusetts, located within the towns of Essex and Hamilton. The lake covers approximately 209 acres (0.85 km^{2}), has an average depth of approximately 9 ft (2.7 m), and reaches a maximum depth of approximately 22 ft (6.7 m).

Chebacco Lake and five tributary ponds make up approximately seven percent of the 7.2 sq mi (19 km^{2}) Chebacco Lake watershed. The watershed includes portions of Essex, Hamilton, Manchester-by-the-Sea, Wenham, and Beverly.

The lake drains through Alewife Brook into the Essex River. It is used for boating, fishing, swimming, canoeing, kayaking, and other recreation and provides spawning habitat for migrating alewife river herring.

Chebacco Lake is designated as a Great Pond under Massachusetts law. Great Ponds not actively used as public water supplies are generally open to the public for boating and fishing, subject to applicable state and municipal regulations.

== Geography and hydrology ==
Chebacco Lake lies within a landscape shaped by glacial activity. Many of its coves are comparatively shallow, and aquatic vegetation has been documented around the lake's perimeter.

A documented surface inflow is an unnamed perennial stream that passes beneath Chebacco Road and connects Round Pond with Chebacco Lake. The lake has a single natural outlet, Alewife Brook, which flows approximately 1.7 mi (2.7 km) before reaching the Essex River.

CLWA describes the broader Chebacco Lake watershed as covering approximately 7.2 sq mi (19 km^{2}), or roughly 4,600 acres (19 km^{2}), across portions of five municipalities. A 2007 Town of Essex open-space plan used a narrower delineation of 3,756 acres (5.869 sq mi) within Essex and Hamilton.

The watershed is naturally connected through its lakes, ponds, streams, wetlands, groundwater, and underlying sand-and-gravel aquifer. According to CLWA, it contains no dams or water-control structures.

== Ecology ==
Chebacco Lake forms part of an anadromous fish route connecting inland spawning habitat with the Essex River. During the spring, alewife river herring travel through the Essex River and Alewife Brook to spawn in the lake.

The Massachusetts Division of Marine Fisheries has estimated that Chebacco Lake provides approximately 206 acres (0.83 km^{2}) of potential alewife spawning habitat. Its river-herring viewing guide describes the run as one of the relatively few in Massachusetts that is not impeded by a dam or fishway.

A 2007 Town of Essex open-space plan described Chebacco Lake as the last remaining alewife spawning lake on the North Shore that had not been converted into a water-supply source and made impassable to migrating fish.

Alewife Brook and its tributaries serve as wildlife corridors, while the surrounding area includes freshwater wetlands, vernal pools, and mapped habitat for rare species. The associated wetlands support fish, waterfowl, turtles, amphibians, and other wildlife.

Beaver activity near Alewife Brook has periodically affected lake levels and the passage available to migrating alewife. CLWA has historically monitored the brook's water level and conditions at the lake outlet.

Rainfall infiltration and water entering the aquifer from Chebacco Lake, Alewife Brook, and surrounding wetlands have been identified as major sources of recharge for municipal wells in Essex.

== History ==
Chebacco Lake was used for commercial ice harvesting during the 19th century. After a railroad line was extended east from Hamilton toward Essex in 1872, the lake became more accessible and developed into a regional resort area.

The Chebacco House was built near the southern end of the lake in 1859. The Winnepoyken Hotel, later known as the Lake Croft Inn, was built in 1888 near the site of the present Hamilton boat ramp.

As the resort era declined, portions of the shoreline developed into a community of compact seasonal cottages on small lots. Many cottages were later converted into year-round residences as road and automobile access improved during the 20th century.

The shift from seasonal cottages to year-round development increased concerns involving stormwater runoff, septic systems, nutrient loading, and shoreline development.

== Recreation and public access ==
Chebacco Lake is used for boating, fishing, swimming, canoeing, kayaking, paddleboarding, rowing, and sailing. A public boat ramp is located on the Hamilton side of the lake.

Centennial Grove, on the Essex side, has historically provided a public beach, recreational facilities, and access for swimmers and hand-launched watercraft. Much of the remaining shoreline is residential or privately owned.

During suitable winter conditions, Chebacco Lake is used for ice skating and ice fishing. Ice boats have also been observed on the frozen lake. Ice or snow kiting has also been practiced on the lake.

As a Great Pond, the lake is generally open to public boating and fishing. Essex and Hamilton may establish and enforce local regulations for activities occurring within their respective portions of the lake, subject to Massachusetts law.

== Environmental concerns and stewardship ==
Municipal planning documents have identified several long-term environmental concerns affecting Chebacco Lake, including eutrophication, deteriorating water quality, invasive aquatic vegetation, sediment accumulation, and reduced recreational opportunities caused by aquatic weed growth.

A state restoration reconnaissance report prepared during the 1990s recommended the development of in-lake and watershed-management programs, evaluation of wastewater-disposal practices around the lake, and further study of aquatic-vegetation and sediment-management methods.

Development along the shoreline and the use of subsurface wastewater-disposal systems have also been identified as potential contributors to poor water quality and nutrient loading.

=== Chebacco Lake & Watershed Association ===
The Chebacco Lake & Watershed Association (CLWA) was founded in 1985. The volunteer organization promotes responsible use of the lake and watershed and works on issues involving water quality, wildlife habitat, recreation, public education, and watershed stewardship. It has worked with the towns of Essex and Hamilton and with agencies of the Commonwealth of Massachusetts.

The association was formed following concern over the arrival of Cabomba, an invasive aquatic plant, in the Chebacco Lake watershed.

The Town of Essex's 2007 open-space plan described CLWA activities as including monitoring beaver activity, checking water levels and fish passage at Alewife Brook, educating residents about watershed protection, and providing information about wildlife and conditions around the lake.

In 2025, the Commonwealth provided a $20,000 legislative earmark toward a proposed two-year Chebacco Lake water-quality study. Essex and Hamilton appropriated $15,000 each, creating an initial first-year public budget of $50,000. Essex served as the lead municipality, and CLWA participated in developing the scope of work and agreed to cover project costs exceeding the initial budget.

CLWA installed a monitoring buoy over the deepest portion of the lake in June 2025. A sensor attached to the installation was intended to record dissolved-oxygen levels hourly as part of research into oxygen depletion, sediment phosphorus release, and conditions associated with cyanobacteria blooms.

In February 2026, an Essex town report described a further $60,000 funding package consisting of a $30,000 Commonwealth legislative earmark and $15,000 contributions from both Essex and Hamilton. The Essex Board of Selectmen subsequently voted unanimously to authorize its chair to sign a continuation contract with Applied Watershed Sciences LLC and other project partners as the documents became available. The meeting minutes described the proposed work as supported through a combination of state, municipal, and CLWA funding.

== Popular culture ==
Chebacco Lake was used to portray the fictional Amoskeag Lake in the 2010 comedy film Grown Ups.

The majority of the film's location work in Essex took place at Chebacco Lake. Centennial Grove was used as the Connecticut lake-house property visited by the film's principal characters and their families.
