= Woodman's of Essex =

Coordinates: 42°37′49″N 70°46′28.5″W

- Interactive map of Woodman's of Essex

Restaurant information
- Established: 1914
- Food type: Seafood
- Dress code: Casual
- Location: Essex
- Website: woodmans.com

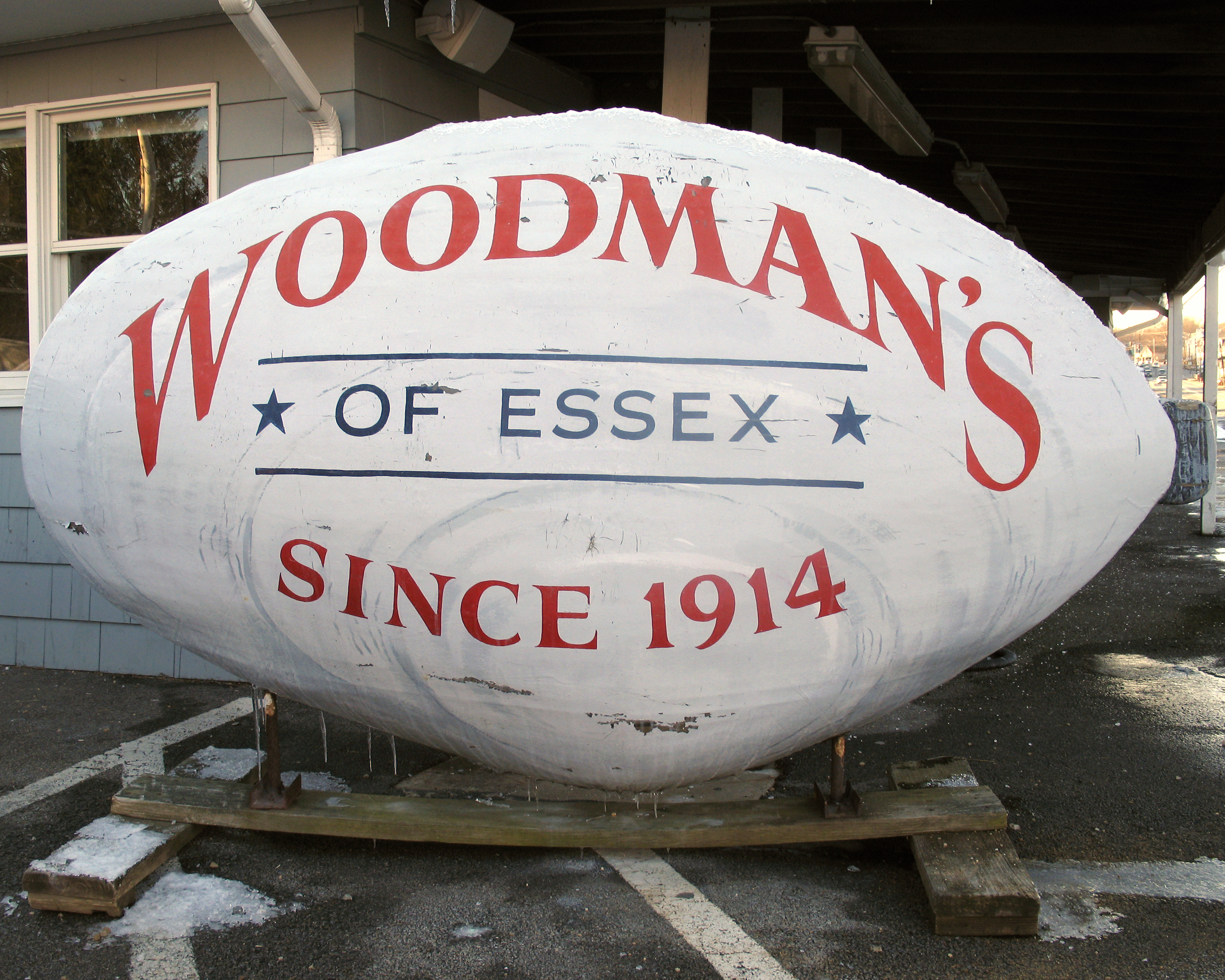
Woodman's of Essex sign

Woodman's of Essex is a seafood restaurant in Essex, Massachusetts (approximately 26 miles (42 km) north of Boston). A local favorite, it is also known internationally for its fried clams and New England clam bakes. Woodman's has been a family business since its founding in 1914, and is a large employer in the area with over 200 staff during the summer months.

== Fried clams ==
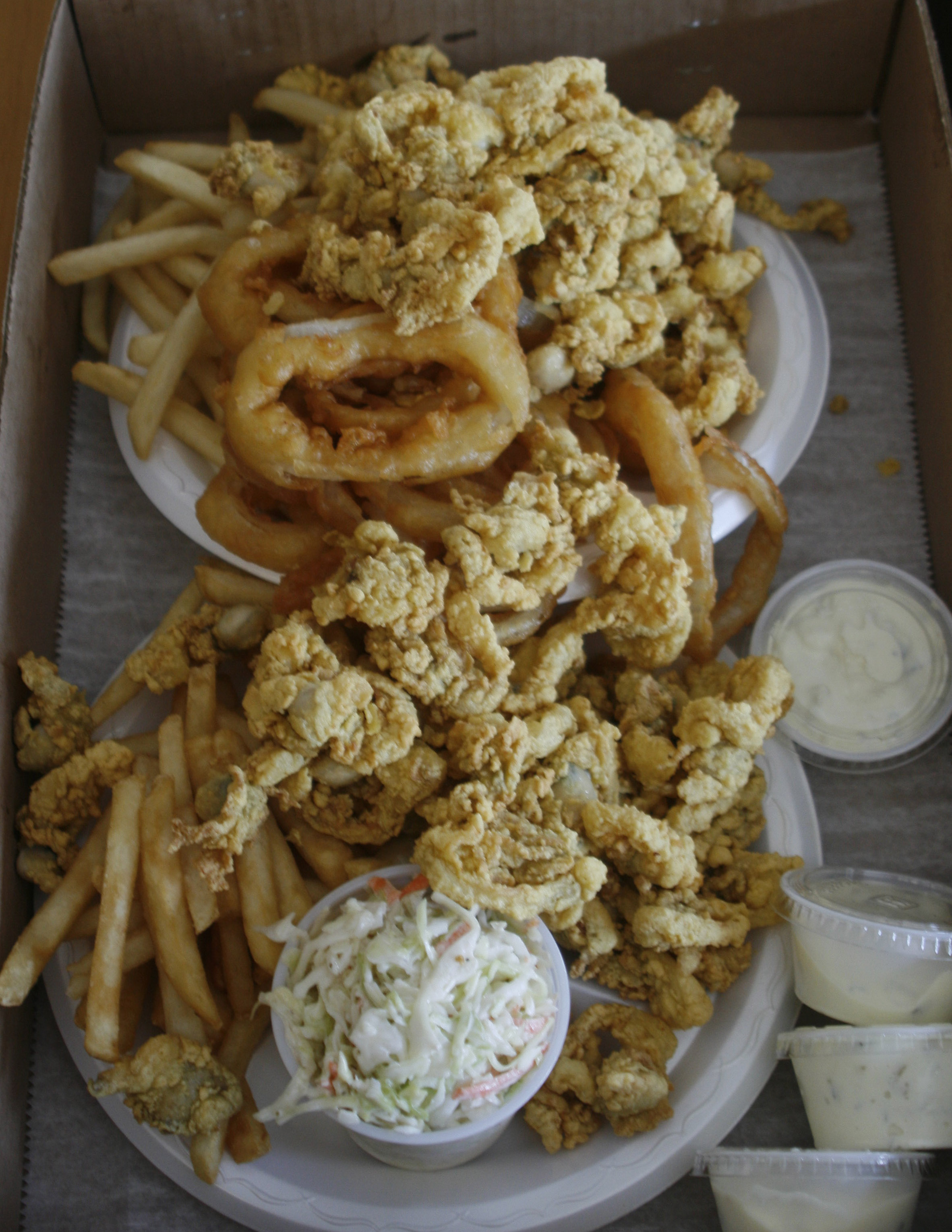
Fried clams, fries, and onion rings

In 1914 Lawrence Henry "Chubby" Woodman and his wife Bessie opened up a clam shack on Essex's Main Street, more commonly known to locals as "the causeway". Chubby and Bessie sold freshly dug steamer clams as well as ice cream and homemade potato chips.

According to legend, Chubby invented the Ipswich fried clams on July 3, 1916. The company website says this happened during a visit from a friend and fisherman, Mr. Tarr of neighboring Gloucester, Chubby took his suggestion to put some clams into the oil used for deep-frying the potato chips. Some modifications were made, such as dipping the clams in evaporated milk and corn flour, and the fried clam was born.

== Clambake to go ==
The traditional New England clam bake is a long process. Chubby Woodman came up with the idea of mobilizing it—a truck was loaded up with food, boilers, and wood, and the clambake was done at the customer's preferred location. Today, Woodman's sells "clambakes to go," consisting of all the necessary ingredients such as lobster, clams, potatoes, and corn. Dependence on the clam has brought risk to the restaurant. In 2005, the red tide was quite severe, leading to lower supplies and price increases. Woodman's was forced to import clams from Canada.

== Reputation ==
Woodman's reputation is recognized in many travel and restaurant guides, such as Frommer's New England, Fodor included the restaurant in their Where to Weekend Around Boston, and the Phantom Gourmet Guide to Boston's Best Restaurants 2008 affirms it has the best fried clams.

== Popular culture ==
The 2010 film Grown Ups uses the restaurant for a segment when all the characters in the film go out for a family dinner, although hamburgers and not fried clams were portrayed as the restaurant's specialty as it was mentioned that they have the best burgers in town. The production of the film caused the restaurant to close for the first time in 95 years in order to film the scene. The sign at the beginning of the scene used the alias "Woodman's Eat in the Rough" and had the character Dickie Bailey (portrayed by Colin Quinn) working there as a chef.

The Beastie Boys' song "Hey Ladies" from their album Paul's Boutique includes the line "Special at Woodman's in Essex Mass"; listed in the printed lyrics, yet never actually recited in the song.

== See also ==
- Clam digging
- Seafood
- Clams casino
- Clam chowder
- List of seafood restaurants
