= Castle Hill (Ipswich, Massachusetts) =

Historic house in Massachusetts, United States

- U.S. National Register of Historic Places
- U.S. National Historic Landmark
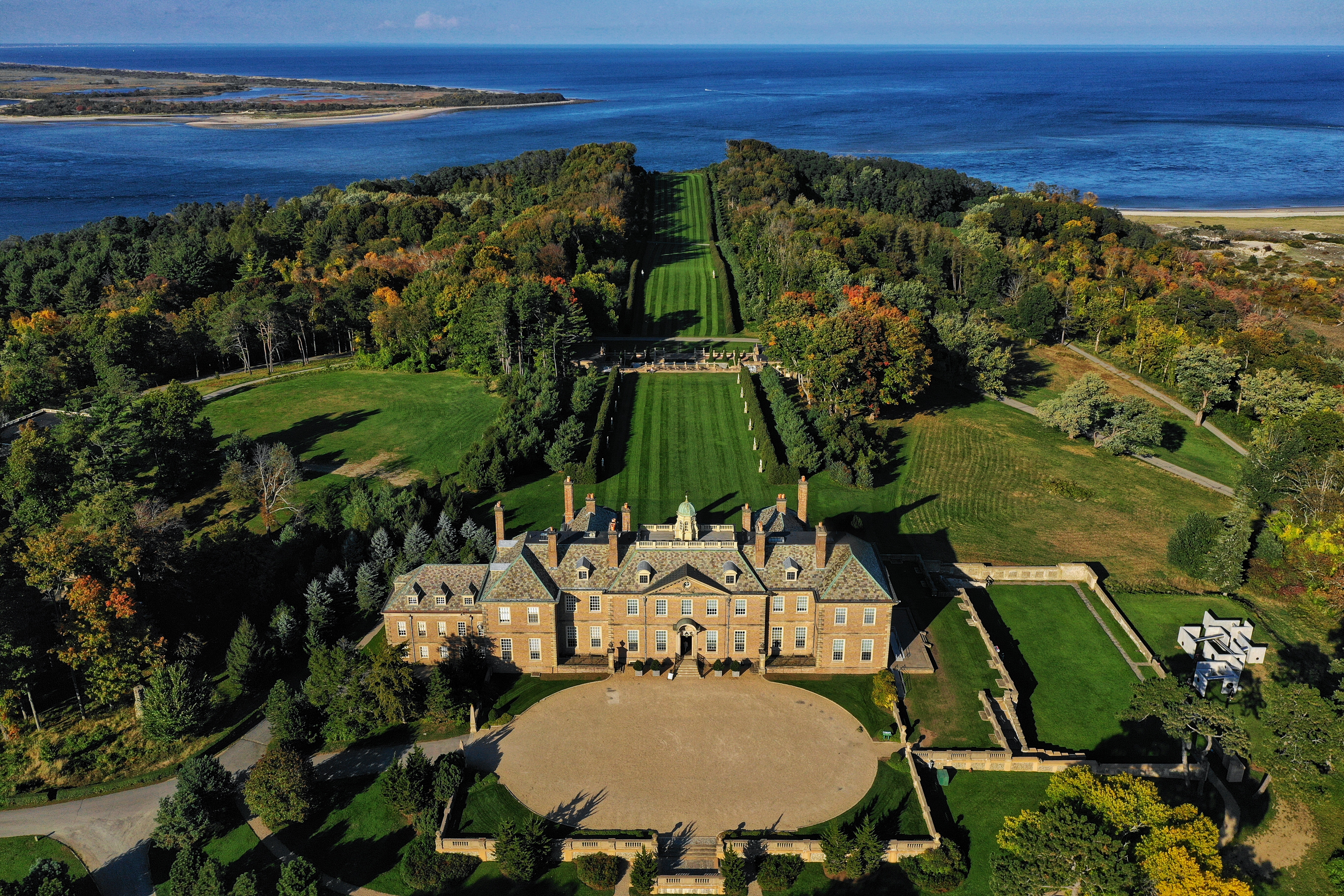

- Location within Massachusetts Location within the United States
- Nearest city: Ipswich, Massachusetts
- Coordinates: 42°41′6.52″N 70°46′45.14″W
- Area: Home 56,881 square feet (5,284.4 m^{2}); Estate 165 acres (67 ha)
- Built: 1926–1928
- Architects: House: David Adler; Gardens: Olmsted Brothers
- Architectural style: Stuart
- NRHP reference No.: 77000183

Significant dates
- Added to NRHP: December 2, 1977
- Designated NHL: August 6, 1998

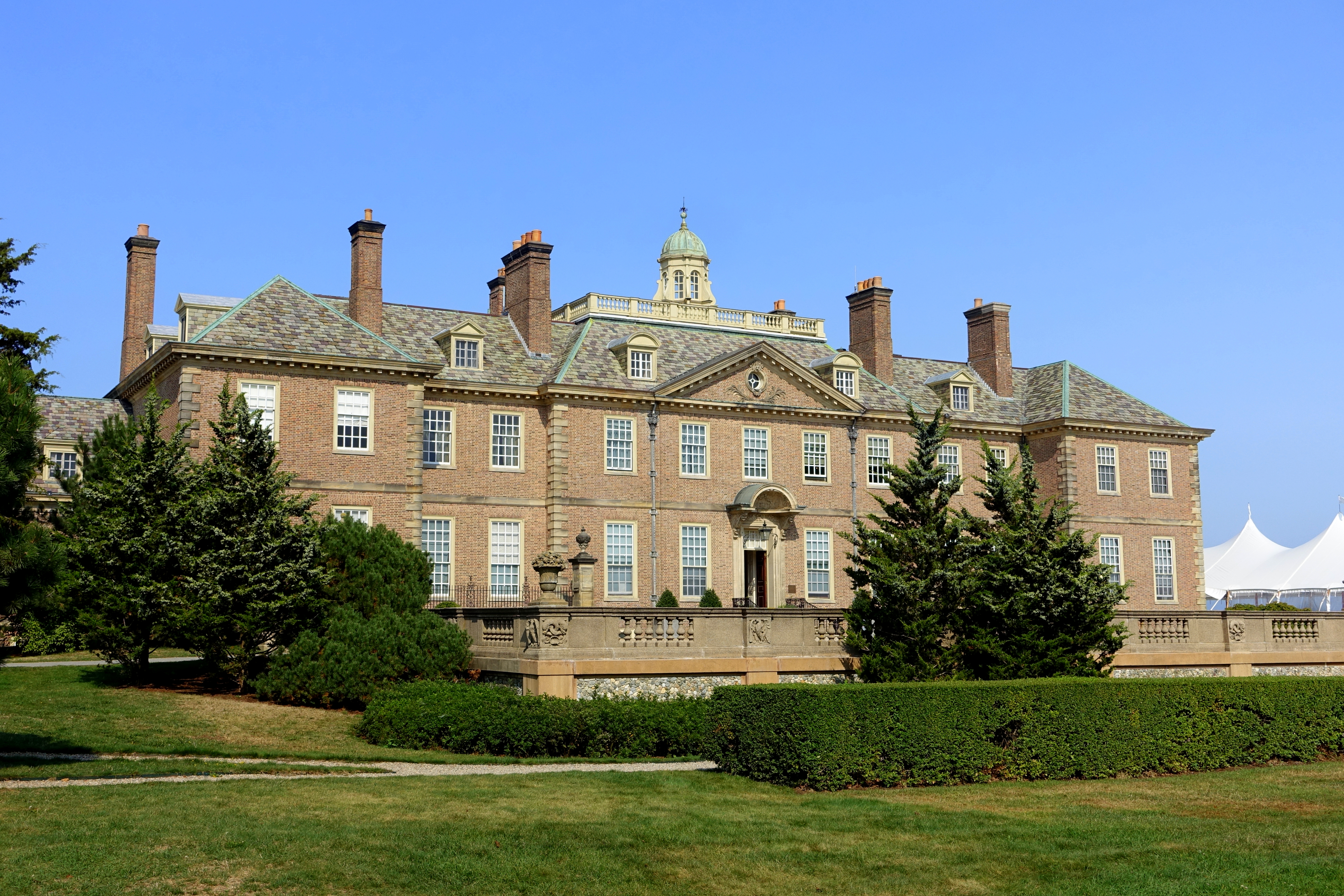
View from the front

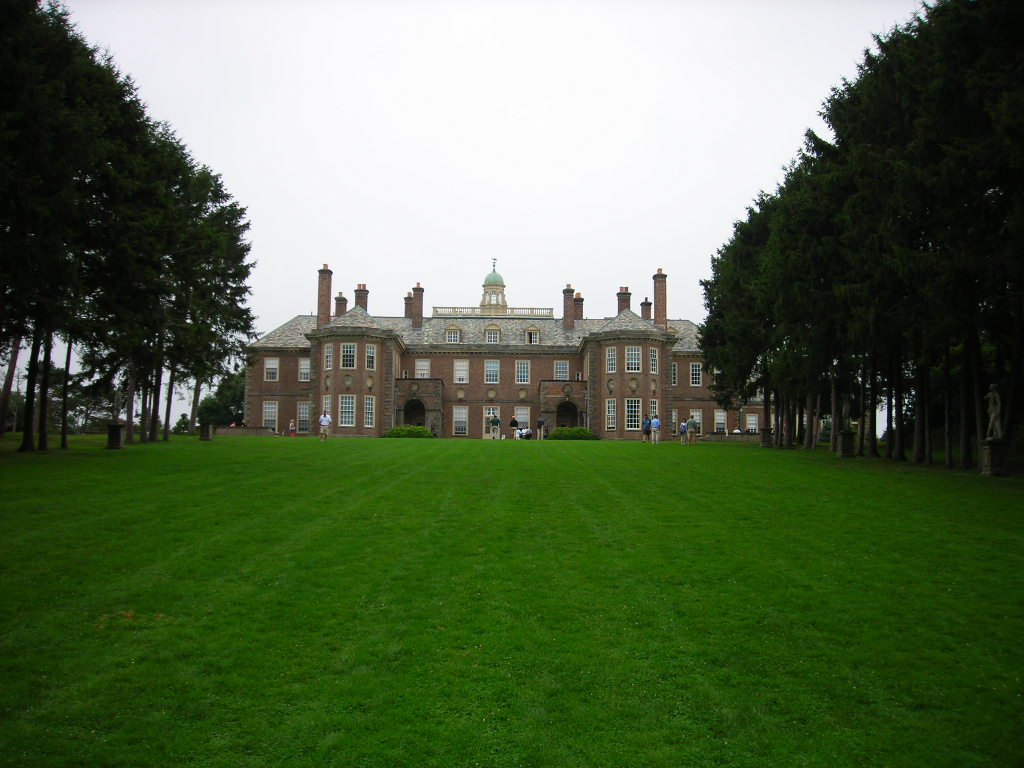
Crane Estate, rear

Castle Hill is a 56,881 sq ft (5,284.4 m^{2}) mansion in Ipswich, Massachusetts, which was completed in 1928 as a summer home for Mr. and Mrs. Richard Teller Crane, Jr. It is also the name of the 165-acre (67 ha) drumlin surrounded by sea and salt marsh that the home was built atop. Both are part of the 2,100-acre (850 ha) Crane Estate, located on Argilla Road. The estate includes the historic mansion, 21 outbuildings, and landscapes overlooking Ipswich Bay on the seacoast off Route 1, north of Boston. Its name derives from a promontory in Ipswich, Suffolk, England, from which many early Massachusetts Bay Colony settlers immigrated.

The estate is a relatively intact work from the Country Place Era of the turn of the 20th century, when wealthy families built extensive country estates. The Crane Estate includes architectural and landscape designs from at least seven firms or individuals of national reputation, including the Olmsted Brothers and Shepley, Rutan and Coolidge, and it is extensively documented. In recognition of its state of preservation and design, it was designated a National Historic Landmark in 1998. The property has been owned by The Trustees of Reservations since 1949 and is open to the public.

== Early history ==
The property's history dates back as far as December 29, 1634, when a group of Ipswich town selectmen unanimously voted "That the Neck of Land wheareuppon the great Hill standeth, which is known by the name of the Castle Hill, lyeinge on the other side of this River towards the Sea, shall remayne unto the common use of the Towne forever."

In June 1637, John Winthrop, Jr., the town's founder and son of Governor John Winthrop, threatened to leave Ipswich, and Castle Hill was deeded to him as an enticement to stay. In 1644, he deeded Castle Hill to Samuel Symonds, Deputy Governor, who in turn deeded it to his son-in-law, Daniel Epps, in 1660.

By 1745, it belonged to the Brown family, and stayed in its hands until after John Burnham Brown died. In January 1910, the property was purchased by Richard Teller Crane, Jr., son of wealthy industrialist Richard Teller Crane, who had founded the Crane Co. of Chicago in 1855.

The Crane Estate was declared a National Historic Landmark in 1998.

== Estate design ==
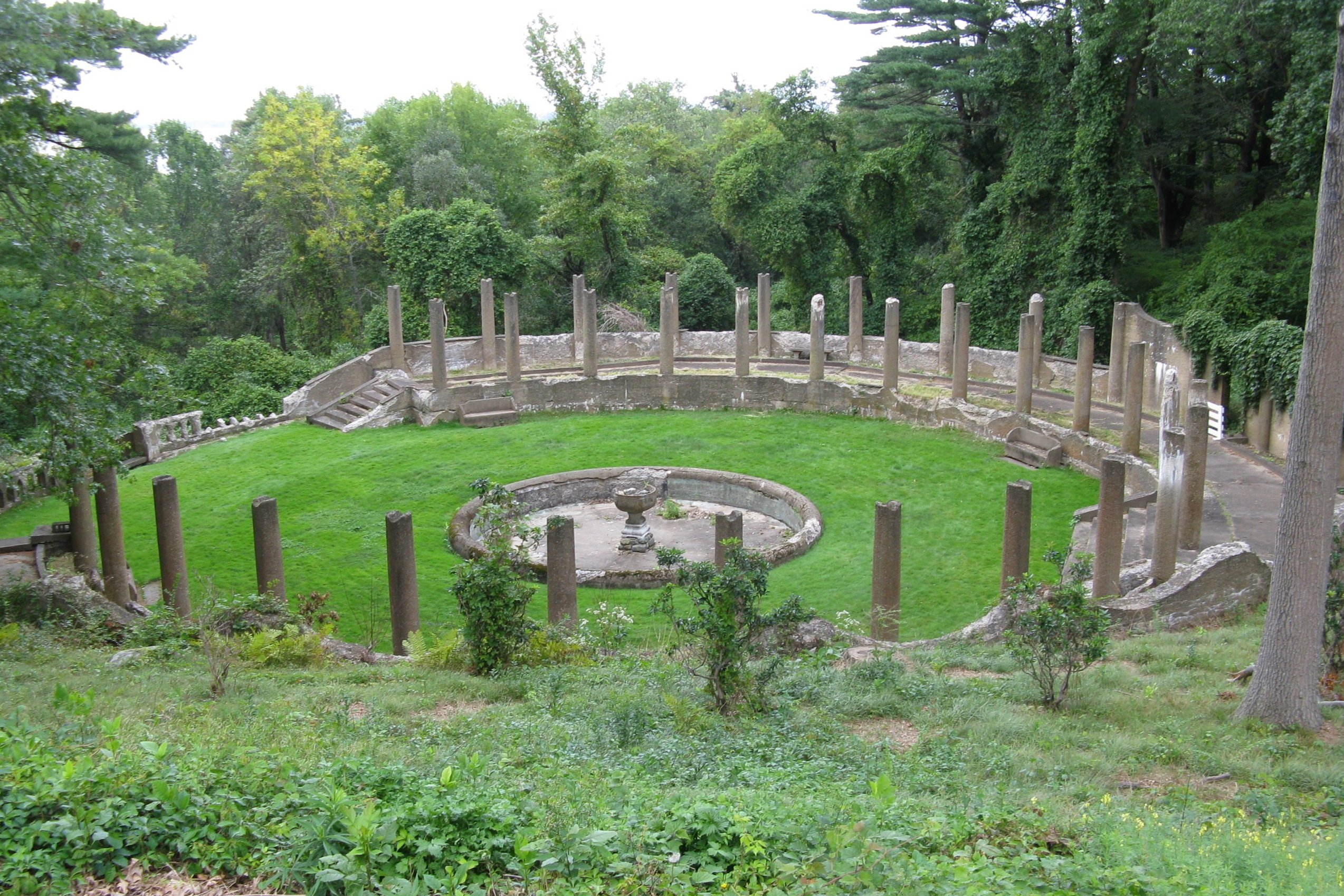
The Rose Garden

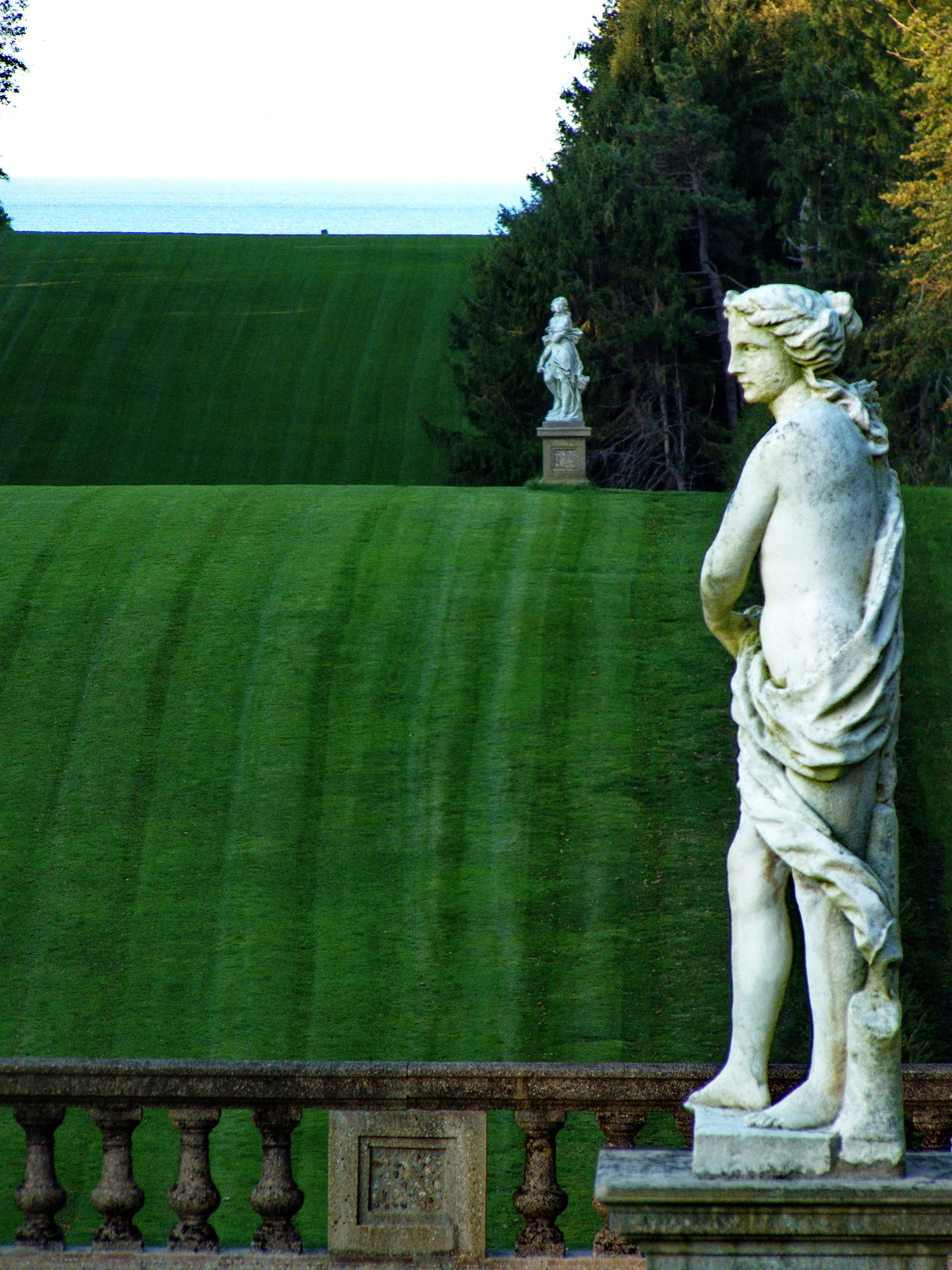
The "Grande Allée" after restoration, 2011

Crane hired the famous Olmsted Brothers, sons of Frederick Law Olmsted (creator of New York's Central Park, Brooklyn's Prospect Park, Boston's Emerald Necklace and others), to design the landscaping. By 1912, they had fashioned a series of ornate terraced gardens, and had begun work on a magnificent grass mall, 160 feet (49 m) wide and lined with evergreens cascading from the top of the hill straight down to the water nearly half a mile away. Classical-style statuary flank at regular intervals this "Grande Allée", the design of which was taken over in 1913 and finished in 1915 by Arthur Asahel Shurcliff after Crane dismissed the Olmsted Brothers. An opulent "casino" (Italian for "Little House") was built at its midpoint, replete with saltwater swimming pool, bathhouse, guest cabanas and a sizable indoor ballroom. Two main gardens, the "Italian Garden" and the "Rose Garden," once contained ornate plantings, landscaped walkways and Italianate fountains.

Atop Castle Hill, Crane built an Italian Renaissance-style villa, with stucco walls and red tiled roof. Designed by Shepley, Rutan and Coolidge of Boston, the edifice was set upon the highest promontory overlooking the Atlantic Ocean.

Upon the summit Mr. Crane has erected his splendid summer home, with a beautiful sunken garden, rose garden, lawns and terraces, commanding a marvelous view of land and sea, of Agamenticus and Boar's Head and the low-lying Isles of Shoals on the distant horizon, Bar Island and the long bar with its many lines of white breakers, sand dunes and the level beach near at hand. Mr. Crane has purchased as well, Wigwam Hill and the great tract of picturesque dunes, the old Castle Neck, with the exception of the small tract owned by the United States, on which the light house was built in 1837. He has acquired also the Sagamore Hill farm.'

Although local rumors postulate that Mrs. Crane’s displeasure with the villa led to its eventual destruction, recent evidence has proven otherwise. The villa’s stucco construction simply couldn’t handle the harsh wind, rain, and snow of New England, especially due to its exposed location on the top of the hill. It was razed in 1924 to make way for a new, stronger home, completed four years later.

Designed by architect David Adler of Chicago, the new fifty-nine-room mansion included a main facade in the 17th-century Stuart style, a library with Grinling Gibbons carvings imported from an English country manor (Cassiobury House), parquet wood flooring, and paneled interior rooms from an 18th-century townhouse at 75 Dean Street in London. Adler's sister Frances Elkins collaborated with him on the interior of the Great House. The rear aspect of the house, with its octagonal towers and inset roundels, was modeled on Ham House. Completed in 1928, this splendid mansion still stands, and aspects of the Olmsted Brothers' landscaping also remain largely unchanged. A pair of immense seated griffin statues by renowned sculptor Paul Manship grace the entrance to the north terrace overlooking the sea. These were a gift from employees of Crane Co. to Richard Crane in 1928, upon completion of his new home.

== Museum & Historic Site ==
After the death of Richard Crane in 1931 on his 58th birthday, the estate passed to his wife, Florence Higinbotham Crane. In 1945, the Crane family donated much of their private beach and dunes to The Trustees of Reservations, a private, non-profit land conservation and historic preservation organization, with 112 properties throughout the Commonwealth of Massachusetts. When Florence Crane died in 1949, the majority of the property, including the mansion, was given to the trustees. Small portions including Choate Island and the family's former golf course were given to her children, Cornelius and Florence.

The property was used as a forum for outdoor concerts in the late 1950s and early 1960s, featuring such jazz legends as Louis Armstrong, Ella Fitzgerald, and Dave Brubeck, and as part of a Castle Hill Art Center and music camp run by the New England Conservatory. Laid out just above the casino and pool, the stage faced the "Great House" so that audiences could sit on the lawn of the Grande Allée, facing the ocean. Since 1996, The Trustees have hosted outdoor picnic concerts each week in the summer. The groups that play at the concerts tend to be from a wide variety of musical genres. The Trustees continue to offer a number of public programs throughout the year, including outdoor picnic concerts on the Allée, their annual Roaring Twenties Lawn Party (which began in 2013), and Christmas events.

The trustees offer historical tours of the Great House and its grounds from April to December, and host several weddings on the property every year. Also part of the estate are Crane Beach and the Crane Wildlife Refuge, both open to the public.

== In popular culture ==
The 1987 film The Witches of Eastwick prominently features the grounds and mansion at Castle Hill, the site filmed on location as home of the eccentric millionaire Daryl Van Horne, played by Jack Nicholson.

The 1987 film Flowers in the Attic also features Castle Hill. It is the main location at which nearly all scenes were filmed.

The 1994 film The Next Karate Kid also features Castle Hill as the Buddhist monastery Mr. Miyagi (Pat Morita) takes Julie Pierce (Hilary Swank) to after she is suspended from school for two weeks.

The 2009 film Ghosts of Girlfriends Past was predominantly filmed inside and outside the mansion. Several fake windows, statues, and columns were added to the building, in addition to a circular driveway added to the front. These fiberglass additions have now been removed, along with the circular driveway.

In the 2014 film The Equalizer, the Crane Estate serves as a Russian oligarch's Moscow, Russia mansion in one of the final scenes.

Phil Keoghan opened the first episode and introduced the video background segments of the contestants of The Amazing Race 17 from the grass mall.

The Crane Estate was featured in several scenes of the 2019 film Little Women.

== See also ==
- National Register of Historic Places listings in Ipswich, Massachusetts
- National Register of Historic Places listings in Essex County, Massachusetts
- List of National Historic Landmarks in Massachusetts
