= Crane Beach =

Conservation and recreation property in Ipswich, Massachusetts

Coordinates: 42.6874°N 70.7696°W

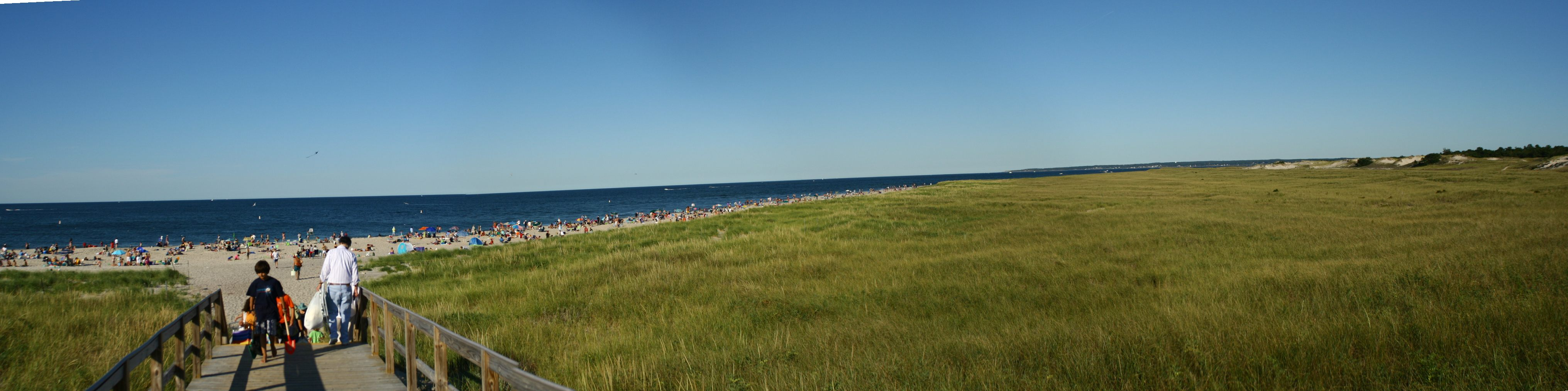
Panorama of Crane Beach in September 2007

Crane Beach is a 1,234-acre (4.99 km^{2}) conservation and recreation property located in Ipswich, Massachusetts, immediately north of Cape Ann. It consists of a four-mile-long (6 km) sandy beachfront, dunes, and a maritime pitch pine forest. Five and a half miles of hiking trails through the dunes and forest are accessible from the beachfront.

Crane Beach is open year-round, and is free to Ipswich residents with the purchase of a yearly beach parking sticker. Non-residents must pay a fee to enter ($40 on weekends during peak season per car, as of 2024). In the summer months there is a refreshment bar, and the restrooms, showers and changing facilities are open year-round.

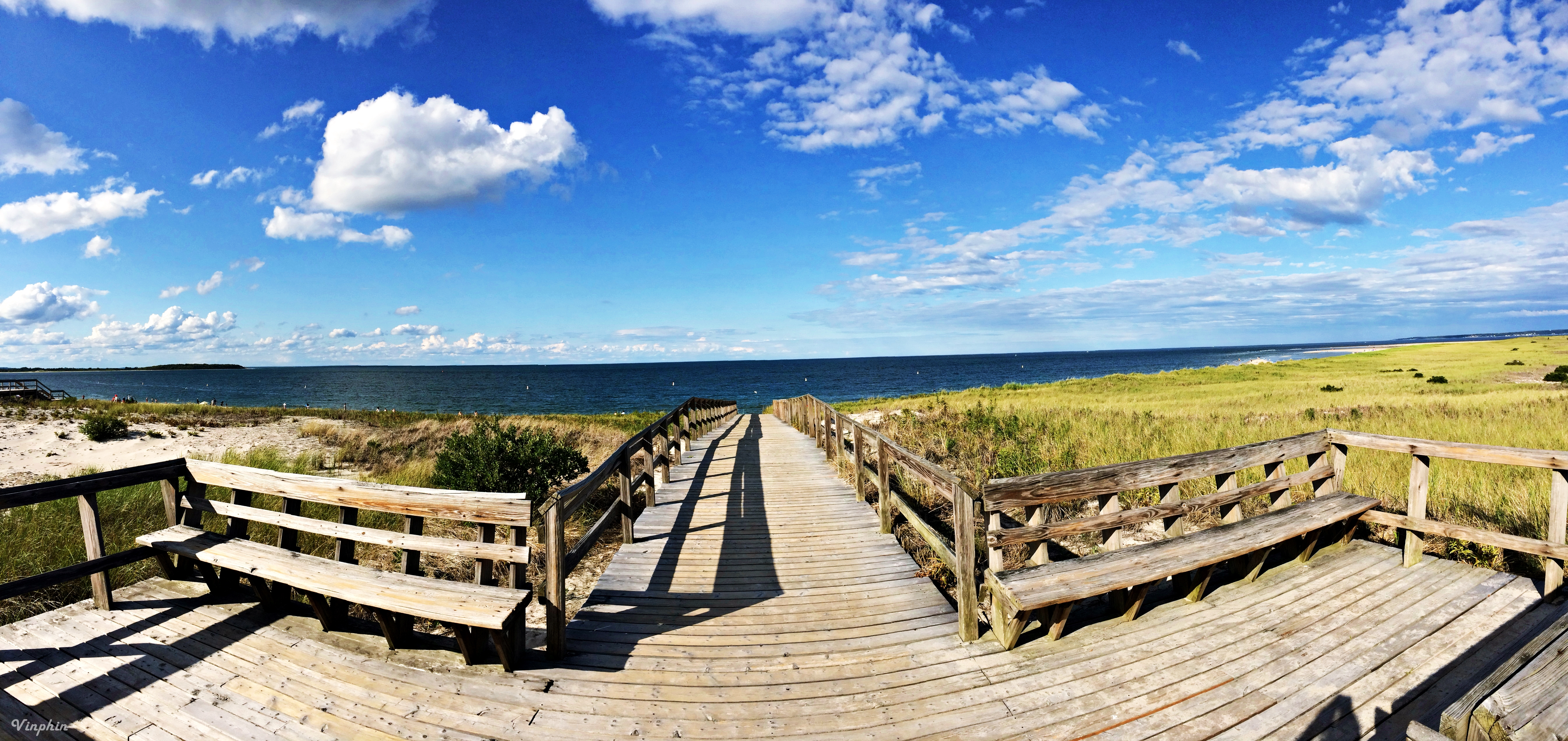
Crane Beach in August 2014

During low tide, it is often possible to wade out to sand bars, and during the warm months small boats often dock on these sand bars. Across the water, Plum Island and its sandy beaches are visible.

Crane Beach was established in 1945 as a gift from Florence Higinbotham Crane, daughter-in-law of Richard T. Crane, and her family. The property is a part of the larger Crane Estate, along with Castle Hill and the Crane Wildlife Refuge, and is owned and maintained by The Trustees of Reservations.

There is an annual celebration that takes place at the beach in June called Crane Beach Day. On this day, students from the Doyon and Winthrop Elementary Schools, as well as the Ipswich Middle School students, gather at the beach during the school day. The middle school students have the option to take part in a run that goes from the Ipswich Town Hall, to the beach. Mr. and Mrs. Richard T. Crane, Jr. (previous owners of the Crane Estate) began a tradition of inviting all the Ipswich school children to the beach for a day in 1911 to celebrate their son, Cornelius’, 6th birthday. Ever since, the tradition of Crane Beach Day has been repeated.

In 2011, the schools celebrated the 100th anniversary of the event. Several students, with birthdays closest to the day of the event, arrived at the beach by boat like they would when the tradition was started. There were people hired to impersonate the Crane family and greet people as they got to the beach, a replica of the old Ipswich Lighthouse, and even a special ice cream flavor dedicated to Cornelius (called “Cornelius Crunch”). In addition, every student received a celebratory t-shirt to wear to the beach, featuring a picture of Cornelius on his 6th birthday.

Crane Beach is an important nesting site for the threatened piping plover. The 2006 International Piping Plover Breeding Census estimated that only 3,884 plovers remained. According to the same 2006 census, Crane Beach was home to 19 breeding pairs and 40 total adults.

The greenhead fly is active in this area for a few weeks in July and early August.

The Cape Ann Transportation Authority (CATA) provides summer weekend bus service between the Ipswich MBTA train station and Crane Beach.

== In popular culture ==
The 1968 movie The Thomas Crown Affair starring Steve McQueen features a scene where McQueen’s character drives a dune buggy across this beach.

The beach scenes for Little Women were filmed on the property.

== See also ==
- Castle Hill
- Crane Wildlife Refuge
