= Biking in Madison =

A cyclist rides eastbound on Madison's Capitol City path near Lake Monona

Madison, Wisconsin is one of the top cities for cycling in the United States. It has over 200 mils of bike trails and is one of five American cities with a Platinum rating from the League of American Bicyclists.

== History ==
Residents have been riding bikes in the Madison area since the late 1800s-early 1900s. In the 1970s, Madison became known for its local racing scene. Several bicycle shops, including Yellow Jersey, which imported bikes from Europe, Japan, as well as locally from Trek Bicycles was instrumental in helping residents obtain bikes and commute throughout the city.

== Cycling Groups ==
Madison is home to countless biking groups, including Cap City Cycling, Motorless Motion Taco Rides, and several Century training groups.
