= Capital Bicycle Club =

Cycling club in Washington, D.C. 1879–1914

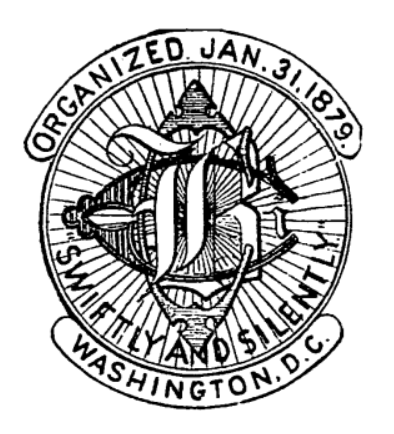
- Formation: January 31, 1879
- Dissolved: c. 1914
- Type: Cycling club
- Headquarters: LeDroit Building, Washington, D.C., United States

The Capital Bicycle Club was an early American cycling club based in Washington, D.C. During the late 1870s, Interest in cycling spread across the United States following the increased importation and marketing of Ordinary-style bicycles (also known as penny-farthings). On January 31, 1879, a group of seven cycling enthusiasts founded the club. Despite initial complaints and suspicion from Washington residents, it became a popular recreational club among the city's white upper-class. The city became known as a "bicycler's paradise" by cyclists due to its wide, smoothly-paved streets. The club held a large numbers of rides across the city and surrounding rural areas, alongside social events at its clubhouse. It also organized annual races and various forms of competitions or "trick-riding" events. Women's participation within the club increased over time, especially strengthened by the spread of the safety bicycle, with equally sized wheels. The club disbanded in 1914 after 35 years of operation.

== Founding ==
Bicycles were first introduced to the United States in the mid-1860s, shortly after the innovation of pedals. However, they were met with little public interest beyond a brief fad surrounding the "boneshaker" during the last years of the decade. Interested by a showcase of English bicycle designs at the 1876 Centennial Exposition, businessmen Frank Weston and Albert Pope began importing English Ordinary-style bicycles (also known as penny-farthings). These were promoted with aggressive marketing campaigns aimed at middle-class consumers, including the creation of cycling magazines, riding schools, and cycling clubs. In February 1878, Pope and Weston helped found the Boston Bicycle Club, the first such club in the country.

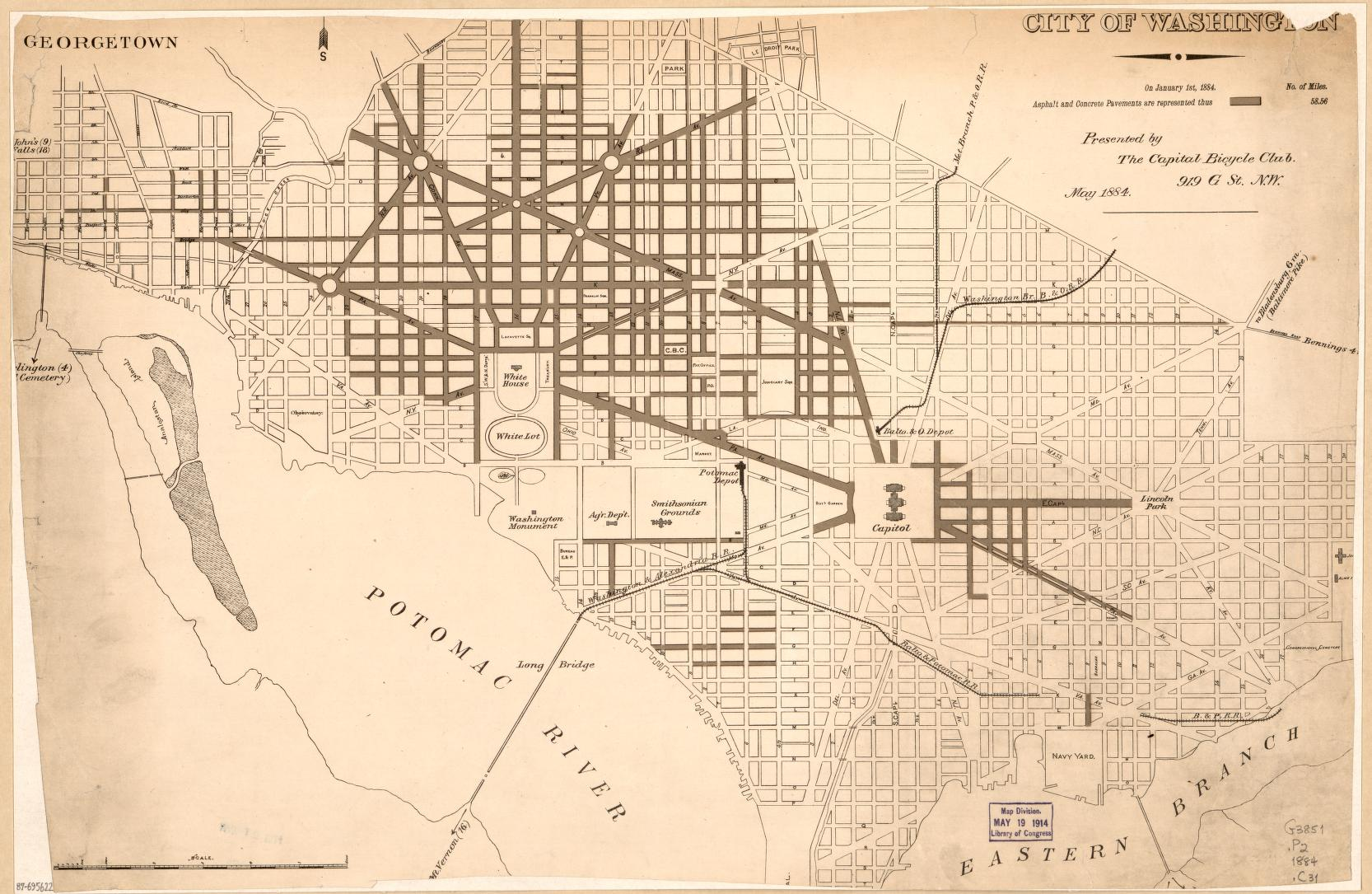
1884 map of Washington issued by the club, showing asphalt and concrete paved roads suitable for cycling

An 1882 issue of The Washington Post dates the introduction of bicycles to Washington, D.C., as 1878. On January 31, 1879, a group of seven cycling enthusiasts met near the Capitol and formed a biking group, which would later be referred to as the Capital Bicycle Club, the first biking organization in the city. It was almost immediately met with suspicion and complaints to the police from local citizens, concerned that the bicycles would pose a risk to pedestrians. Chief of Police Thomas P. Morgan was sympathetic to the cyclists, declaring the sport "honest, manly exercise promoting the physical health of participants, and tending to keep them out of bar-rooms and other questionable resorts."

== Operations ==
Soon after the club's founding, the city had acquired a reputation as a "bicycler's paradise" due to its broad and smoothly-paved streets. The club drew from a base of young affluent white men in the district, including some members of the federal government. Members of the club wore white hats and blue uniforms. Following a resolution in 1884, they agreed to wear bicycle breeches to work at least three days per week.

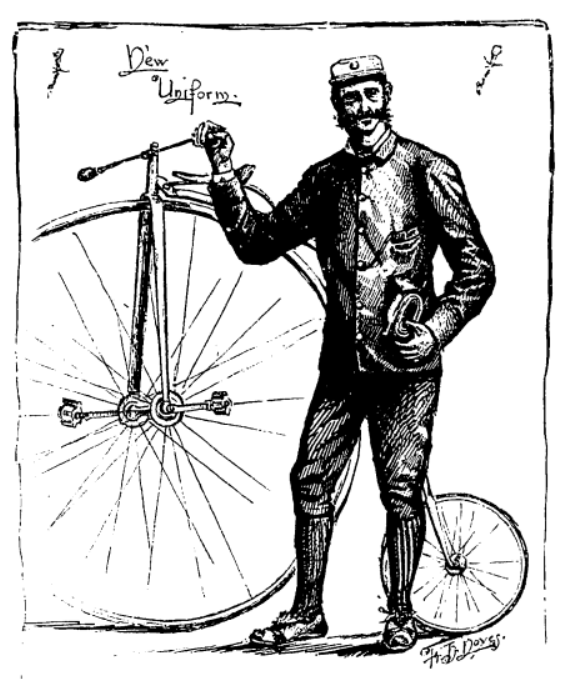
1883 sketch showing the club's newly-adopted uniform

Club members often participated in biking runs, either within the city itself or to neighboring areas of Maryland and Virginia. "Trick riding" was also popular within the club, with multiple members riding their bicycles down the steps of the Capitol building. The inherent difficulty and danger of the Ordinary-style bicycles was enjoyed as a challenge by club members. Scrapbook sketches were compiled of notable falls. Challenging stunts and technical feats, such as ascending steep hills or following a leader along a planned obstacle-course route were common activities. During periods of inclement weather, members participated in various indoor challenges. These included "stand-stills", where riders attempted to stay balanced atop their stationary bikes for as long as possible.

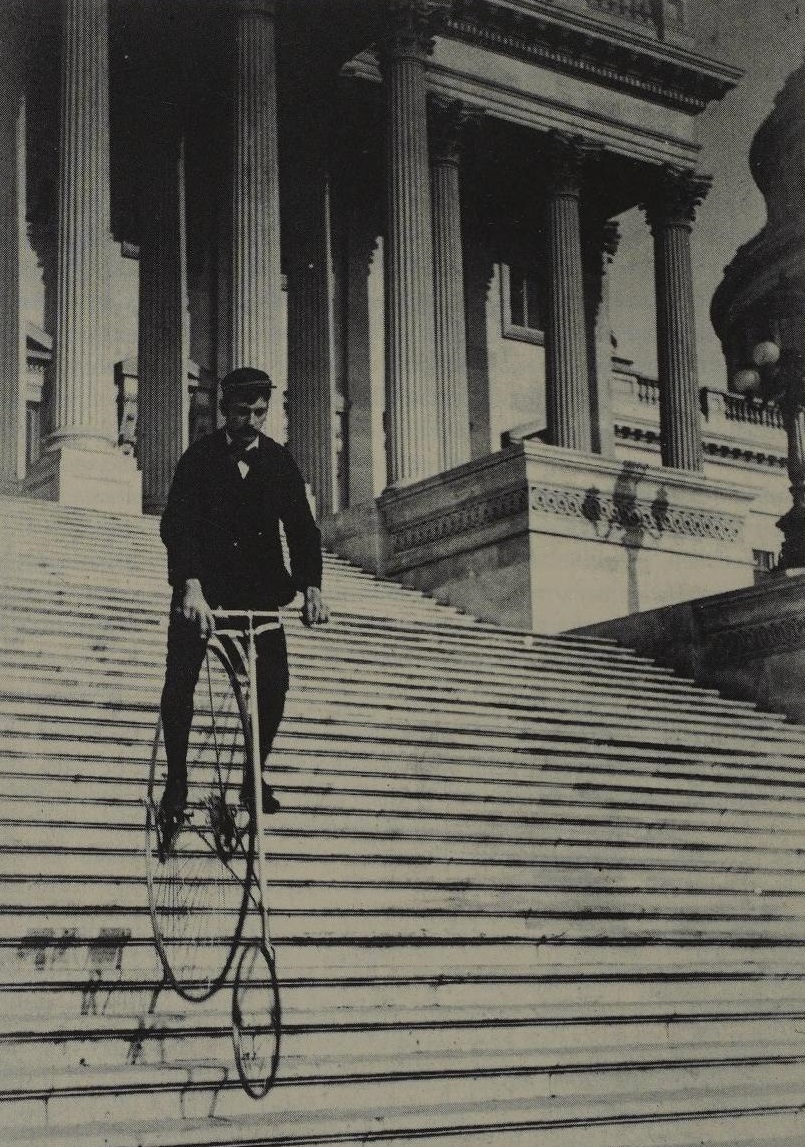
Club member Rex Smith cycling down the steps of the United States Capitol, 1884

The club held a series of annual races, with the first held at Iowa Circle on June 28, 1880, watched by around 5,000 attendees. Racing events held by the club frequently included band concerts held before or during the race. An 1881 music programme by Henry Donch's band, typical for such events, featured a variety of songs adapted from opera, alongside dance songs in styles such as the popular and fast-paced galop. As the club grew, various social events gained popularity in addition to cycling. Members would attend gatherings at the clubhouse in the LeDroit Building, which also served as a venue for bicycle storage and maintenance. Although the clubhouse was described as a place where "many a cider jug has come in full and gone out empty", intoxication was strictly prohibited during rides.

The club gradually shifted away from a purely masculine environment, with greater participation from members' wives and partners during the late 1880s at events such as group picnics. To accommodate female riders and their tricycles, many group events took a more leisurely pace, with a greater focus on smooth rides to scenic locales. An 1889 multi-day ride to Shenandoah Mountain was advertised as an "enjoyable and beneficial tour, making 25 and 30 miles per day". While the safety bicycle (featuring equally-sized front and back wheels) was initially viewed as less challenging and sportsmanlike by many American cyclists, the Capital Bicycle Club became interested in the design and its "practical riding", in large part due to its popularity among women.

The club disbanded around 1914. A reunion banquet to celebrate the fiftieth anniversary of the club was attended by a group of 60 former members at the Cosmos Club on January 31, 1929.

== Notable members ==
- DeLancey W. Gill, photographer and artist
- Leland Ossian Howard, entomologist
- Alexander George McAdie, meteorologist
