= Henry Donch =

German-American bandleader (1834–1919)

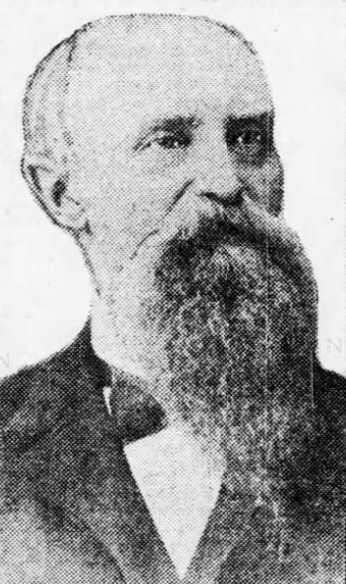
- Donch, c. 1900s–1910s
- Born: 1834; Electorate of Hesse
- Died: March 10, 1919 (aged 85); Washington, D.C., United States
- Resting place: Rock Creek Cemetery, Washington, D.C.
- Occupation: Bandleader
- Years active: 1850s–1910s
- Spouse: Elizabeth Brandt (m. 1856)
- Children: 6

Henry Donch (1834 – March 10, 1919) was a German-American bandleader and music instructor. Born in Hesse-Kassel, he immigrated to Philadelphia in 1854. Shortly afterwards, he became organist for the United States Naval Academy Band in Annapolis. He joined the United States Marine Band as a clarinet player shortly before the outbreak of the American Civil War. In 1865, he played in the orchestra at Ford's Theatre. In the early 1870s, he retired from the Marine Band and formed Donch's Band (German: Donsche Musikkapelle), which he would lead for the following four decades. Donch himself was the only consistent member of the band, with the other members frequently rotating. For 23 years, he also worked as a music professor at Georgetown University. In 1919, he died at his home in Washington, D.C., and was buried at Rock Creek Cemetery.

== Biography ==
Henry Donch was born in the German principality of Hesse-Kassel in 1834. He immigrated to the United States in 1854, initially settling in Philadelphia. The following year, he joined the United States Naval Academy Band in Annapolis, Maryland, and became its chapel organist. He married Elizabeth Brandt, another German immigrant, in Baltimore on October 2, 1856. In 1859, he became a naturalized citizen. He had six children, all of whom became musicians.

Shortly before the outbreak of the American Civil War, he enlisted into the United States Marine Corps and was assigned to the United States Marine Band as a clarinet player. He played in the band through the duration of the Civil War, retiring from it several years after the end of the conflict. On April 14, 1865, he played in the orchestra of Ford's Theatre and witnessed the assassination of President Abraham Lincoln, including John Wilkes Booth's jump onto the stage. He would consistently claim throughout his life that Booth never exclaimed "sic semper tyrannis" after the assassination. Twenty years later, in 1882, he served on the grand jury which indicted President James A. Garfield assassin Charles J. Guiteau. He worked as a music professor at Georgetown University for 23 years. He taught a number of instruments including violin, guitar, banjo, flute, clarinet, and cornet.

=== Donch's Band ===
He formed Donch's Band (German: Donsche Musikkapelle) in the early 1870s, which he would lead for the next four decades. Donch himself was the only consistent member of the group; his grandson described the band as "whatever Donch brought with him that night." The exact size of the band is unknown and likely varied. Some music in his repertoire was scored for twenty-five pieces, but may have been reduced by eliminating redundant instruments. He led a twenty-piece band to the Grand Military Reunion in Atlanta, Georgia.

Donch frequently purchased piano arrangements of opera pieces and wrote arrangements for orchestral or string bands. This allowed him to save money on purchasing copies of pieces, and offered greater creative control over the performance. His repertoire included a variety of operatic pieces, show tunes, and dances such as galops.

As a faculty member at Georgetown, Donch and his band regularly played at various university events and commencements. His band also played at a number of resorts in the surrounding region, including the Capon Springs Resort, Berkeley Springs, and the tourist center of Oakland, Maryland. Performances by Donch and other prominent Washington musicians were widely publicized in advertising for the resorts. During the 1890s, he played nightly concerts at Chevy Chase Lake, just outside the district's borders. The Marine Band abruptly took over these duties in 1901. Although bands were ubiquitous at upscale Washington social events, newspaper columns rarely mentioned the presence of specific bands at such events. Like other bandleaders in Washington, Donch also played at athletic events, including the 1881 annual race of the Capital Bicycle Club.

On March 10, 1919, Donch died at his home in the Northwest quadrant of Washington, and was buried at Rock Creek Cemetery.
