= Worcester State Hospital Farmhouse =

Historic house in Massachusetts, United States

- U.S. National Register of Historic Places
- U.S. Historic district – Contributing property
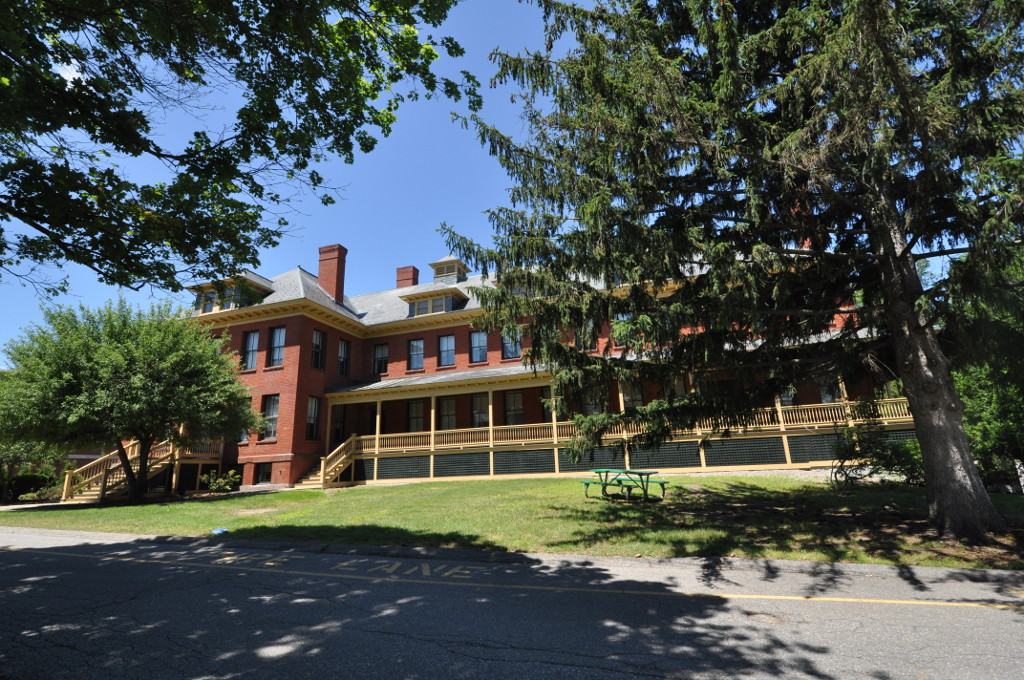

- Location within Massachusetts Location within the United States
- Location: 361 Plantation St., Worcester, Massachusetts
- Coordinates: 42°16′32″N 71°46′2″W
- Area: less than one acre
- Built: 1895
- Architectural style: Georgian Revival
- Part of: Worcester Asylum and related buildings (ID80000530)
- NRHP reference No.: 100001262

Significant dates
- Added to NRHP: July 3, 2017
- Designated CP: March 5, 1980

The Worcester State Hospital Farmhouse is a historic psychiatric hospital building at 361 Plantation Street, on the former grounds of the Worcester State Hospital in Worcester, Massachusetts. Built in 1895, it is a well-preserved local example of Georgian Revival architecture, and is notable as a prototype for similar buildings in the Massachusetts state hospital network. It served as an outbuilding of Worcester State Hospital until 1969, housing select residents who worked in its fields. It now houses state mental health offices. It was listed on the National Register of Historic Places in 2017.

== Description and history ==
The former Worcester State Hospital Farmhouse is located near the eastern edge of the former Worcester State Hospital complex, a property of more than 200 acres (81 ha) that has in part been redeveloped for commercial purposes. It is located just west of Plantation Street and south of Research Drive. It is a 2 1/2-story brick building that is L-shaped and covered by a hip roof with two cupolas. The building was historically divided functionally into a residence for the farm overseer and his family, with a dormitory and residence wing for hospital staff and inmates. The long dormitory wing is fronted on the Plantation Street side by a long shed-roof porch with a tall latticework skirt obscuring the basement and Tuscan columns for support.

The farmhouse was built in 1895 to a design by the Worcester architects Fuller & Delano. The Worcester State Hospital, founded in 1833 as the Worcester Lunatic Asylum, had been experiencing increased demand for its services, and in 1870 the state purchased land for the campus on Worcester's east side. The main building, a large Kirkbride Plan was built soon afterward (and was largely demolished in the 1990s). At the time of the 1870 land purchase, one of the extant farmhouses was adapted for use to house patients and staff involved in the hospital's agricultural activities. This building was built as a replacement for that house, and is a particularly elegant example of Georgian Revival architecture. Its design was used as a model for similar buildings at Danvers State Hospital (since demolished), Medfield State Hospital, and Westborough State Hospital.

== See also ==
- National Register of Historic Places listings in eastern Worcester, Massachusetts
