= Worcester State Hospital =

- Massachusetts Department of Mental Health
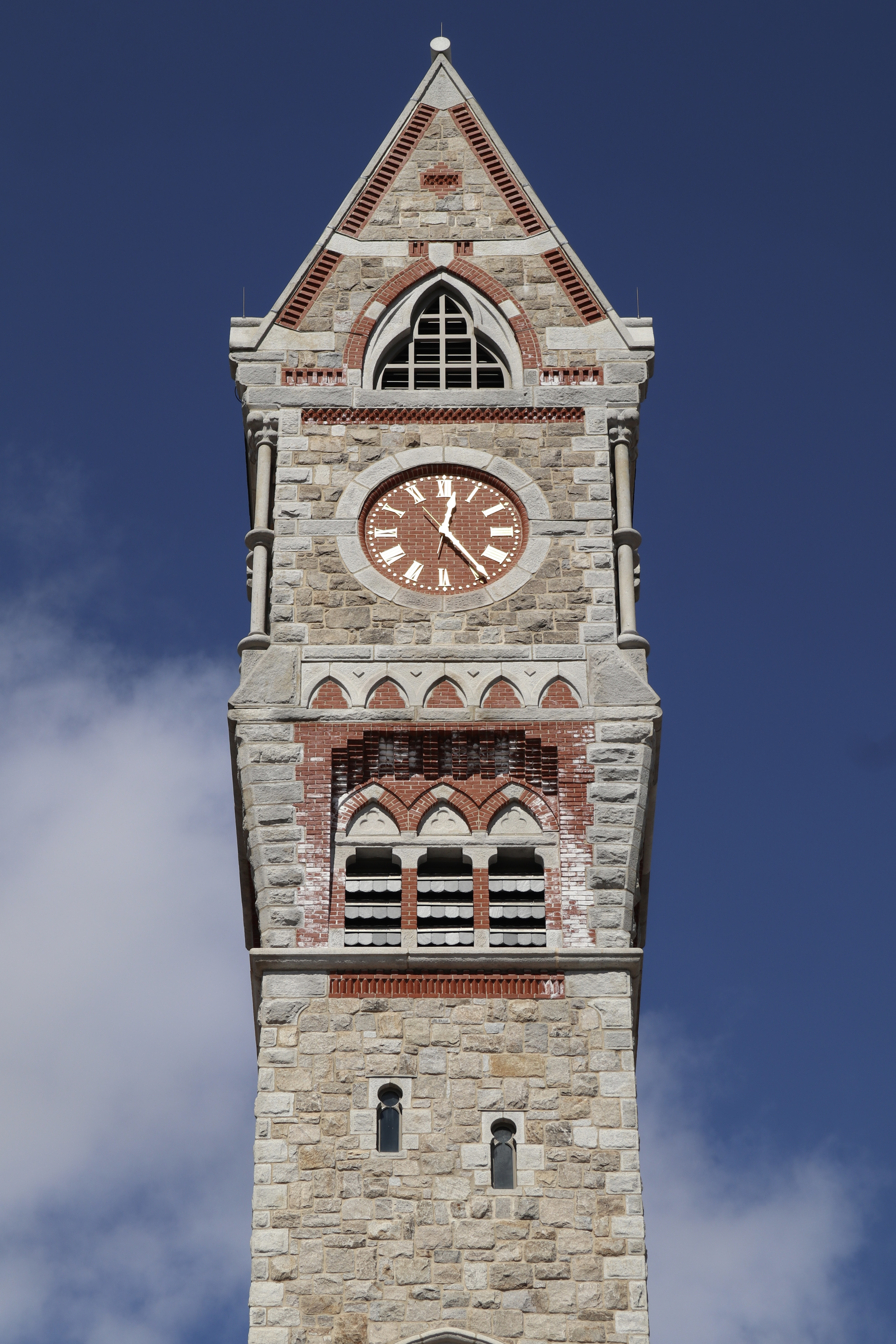
- The reconstructed clock tower of the now-demolished Worcester State Hospital in Worcester, Massachusetts in March 2023.

Geography
- Location: Worcester, Massachusetts, United States

Organization
- Type: Psychiatric

History
- Founded: 1833
- Closed: 2012

Links
- Lists: Hospitals in Massachusetts
- Other links
- Worcester Asylum and related buildings
- U.S. National Register of Historic Places
- Location within Massachusetts Location within the United States
- Location: 305 Belmont St., Worcester, Massachusetts
- Coordinates: 42°16′43.2″N 71°46′9.5″W
- Built: 1870-1876
- Architect: Weston & Rand; Et al.
- Architectural style: Gothic
- MPS: Worcester MRA
- NRHP reference No.: 80000530
- Added to NRHP: March 05, 1980

Worcester State Hospital was a Massachusetts state mental hospital located in Worcester, Massachusetts. The complex is attributed to the architectural firm Weston & Rand. The hospital and surrounding associated historic structures are listed as Worcester Asylum and related buildings on the National Register of Historic Places.

It was once known as the Worcester Lunatic Asylum and the Bloomingdale Asylum. The hospital dates back to the 1830s. On January 12, 1833, the Worcester Insane Asylum opened. It was the first of its kind in the state. During the first year, 164 patients were received.

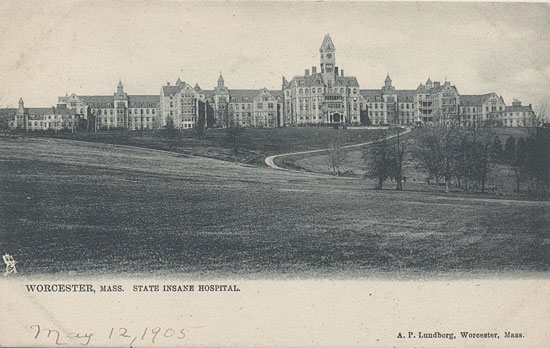
Worcester State Insane Hospital pictured on a postcard dated 1905.

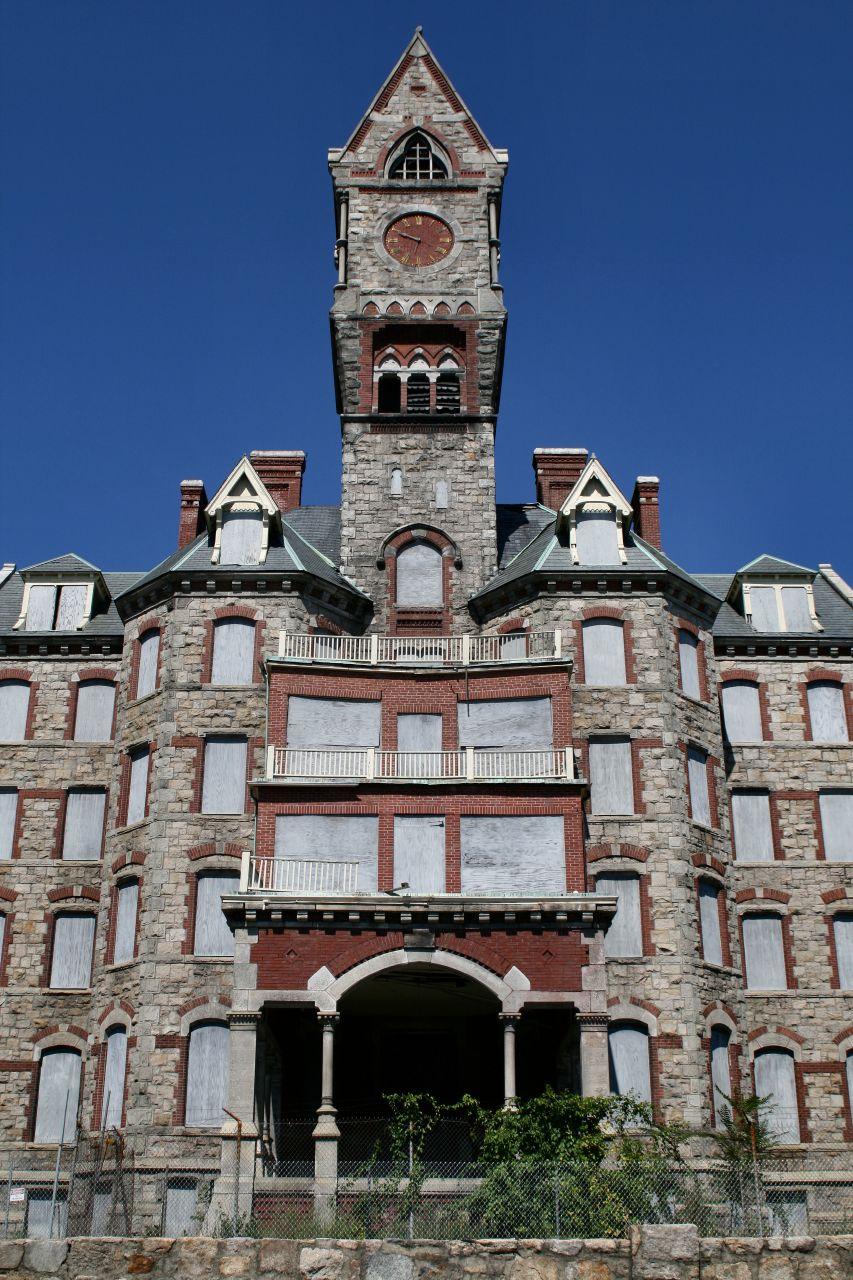
The administration building and clock tower prior to its demolition.

Rapid overcrowding soon prompted superintendent Merrick Bemis to advocate for the construction of a new facility. A large-scale hospital was subsequently designed according to the Kirkbride Plan and located on Belmont Street. Construction began in 1870 and the newly built Worcester State Hospital was completed in 1876 at the cost of well over a million dollars.

The wards were named after places in Massachusetts as well as numerous founders of the American Psychiatric Association, such as Howe, Appleton, Woodward, Gage, Hooper, Folsom, and Thayer.

== History ==
In 1901 a satellite facility which became the Grafton State Hospital was opened in nearby Grafton, Massachusetts to give non-violent patients an opportunity to engage in therapeutic work in a rural environment.

During its operation, the hospital housed thousands of patients. In 1949, the daily operations of the facility were documented by Life magazine.

In 1958, the Bryan Building was added to relieve stress on the aging Kirkbride complex. Operations slowly transferred to Bryan until the original Kirkbride was abandoned in 1985.

In 1991, the Kirkbride suffered numerous fires which left the left wing destroyed and the right wing partially damaged. In 1992, the state declared the site "an effective total loss".

=== Current use and redevelopment ===
Although the facility was officially closed in 1991, operations still continued in the Bryan Building until 2012. In 2004 a proposal to build a new facility on this property was put into the works and called for all of the remaining newer and old building to be torn down.

In 2008, there were plans to film Shutter Island on the grounds of the hospital. Because of the pending demolition of the facility, filming was not approved and instead the filming took place at Medfield State Hospital.

In 2008, the remaining buildings on the property with the exception of the Administration Block (with its notable clock tower), the Hooper Turret, and the Hale Building, were torn down. In the spring of 2009 construction on the new hospital began. Designed by Ellenzweig Associates the new facility is 428,000 square feet and LEED Gold Certified.

The new hospital, dubbed Worcester Recovery Center & Hospital (WRCH), was completed in October 2012 and has three recovery stages - House, Neighborhood, and Downtown, progressing as recovery increases. The facility has 260 adult beds, 30 adolescent inpatient beds and 30 adolescent intensive residential treatment beds. All patients in Bryan were transferred to the new complex within a month of the new facility's opening.

In 2015, the salvaged clock tower was transformed into a memorial, dedicated to the original Kirkbride building and the effect Worcester had on American Psychiatry.

In 2018, the former employee cottages were razed and plans to demolish the Bryan Building and Hale Buildings gained popularity in favor of a new biomedical campus.

== Notable faculty ==
- Andras Angyal, psychiatrist in the research unit from 1937 to 1945.
- David Shakow, psychologist in the research unit.
- Anton Boisen, chaplain 1924 to 1930, who pioneered clinical pastoral education at the hospital in 1925.
- Adolf Meyer, psychiatrist and pathologist 1895 to 1902; pioneer of psychobiology and psychiatric case histories.

== See also ==
- Worcester State Hospital Farmhouse
- National Register of Historic Places listings in eastern Worcester, Massachusetts
