= Phyllis Harmon =

Bicycling advocate known for hand in founding the League of American Wheelmen

Phyllis W. Harmon (October 14, 1916 – August 26, 2016) was an American bicycle enthusiast.

== Early life ==
Harmon was born in Chicago in 1916 and started cycling at the age of 12 after buying her own bicycle.

== The League of American Wheelmen (L.A.W.) ==
The L.A.W., a national organization for cyclists, was founded in 1880 and actively defended the rights of cyclists until 1902, when the League became dormant. In the 1930s, Dick Wilson, a bicycle industry representative, invited members of the Evanston Bicycle Touring Club to become the first chapter of the inactive L.A.W. Harmon, age 19, joined and immediately began recruiting new members. After learning that three clubs could come together and form a council, she encouraged the Rambler Cycle Club and Oak Park Cycle Club to join with the Evanston club to become the first council in the League.

After World War II, the proliferation of automobiles and narrow highways left little room on the roads for bicycles. Bicycling was no longer safe or fun, so the League became inactive again in 1955. It re-opened again in 1966.

Harmon served the organization in every conceivable role as a volunteer, office staff, historian, treasurer, executive vice president, and interim executive director (a position she held for four years). She also served as editor of the League's monthly bulletin for more than thirty years.

== Honors ==
- In 1979, Harmon was awarded the Dr Paul Dudley White Award, the League of American Wheelmen's top national award, honoring individuals who are an "inspiration to others for his or her commitment to the future of bicycling and to significant progress in education, safety, rights, or benefits of bicycling".
- In 1985, the League of American Wheelmen established the Phyllis Harmon Volunteer of the Year Award to recognize individuals who have made extraordinary contributions to bicycling.
- In 2005, she was listed as number 12 in the League of American Bicyclists' Top 25 Change Agents for Cycling, honoring "25 people who indelibly changed the face of cycling in America."
- In 2006, Harmon was inducted into The Chicagoland Bicycle Federation Hall of Fame.
- In 2009, Harmon was inducted into the United States Bicycling Hall of Fame and was, at the time, the oldest living member.
- The ‘Harmon Hundred’ is a 100-mile bicycle race in Wisconsin which is named after Harmon.

== Personal life ==
Harmon was married twice and had six children.

Her final bicycle ride was at the age of 95, when she rode with her daughter in a Mothers’ Day trail.

She died in Florida at age 99.
