= League of American Bicyclists =

Non-profit organization in the US

- Founded: May 30, 1880; 146 years ago
- Founder: Kirk Munroe and Charles Pratt
- Tax ID no.: 36-6206225
- Legal status: 501(c)(3)
- Purpose: To lead the movement to create a bicycle-friendly America for everyone.
- Headquarters: Washington, DC, USA
- Location: 1612 K Street NW, Suite 1102, Washington, D.C. 20006, United States
- Origins: Newport, Rhode Island, United States
- Region served: United States
- Chair: Danielle Arigoni
- Executive Director: Bill Nesper
- Revenue: $1,837,299 (2016)
- Expenses: $2,035,381 (2016)
- Employees: 16 (2026)
- Volunteers: 100 (2016)
- Website: bikeleague.org

The League of American Bicyclists (LAB), officially the League of American Wheelmen, is a membership organization that promotes cycling for fun, fitness and transportation through advocacy and education. A Section 501(c)(3) nonprofit organization, the League is one of the largest membership organizations of cyclists in the United States.

== History ==
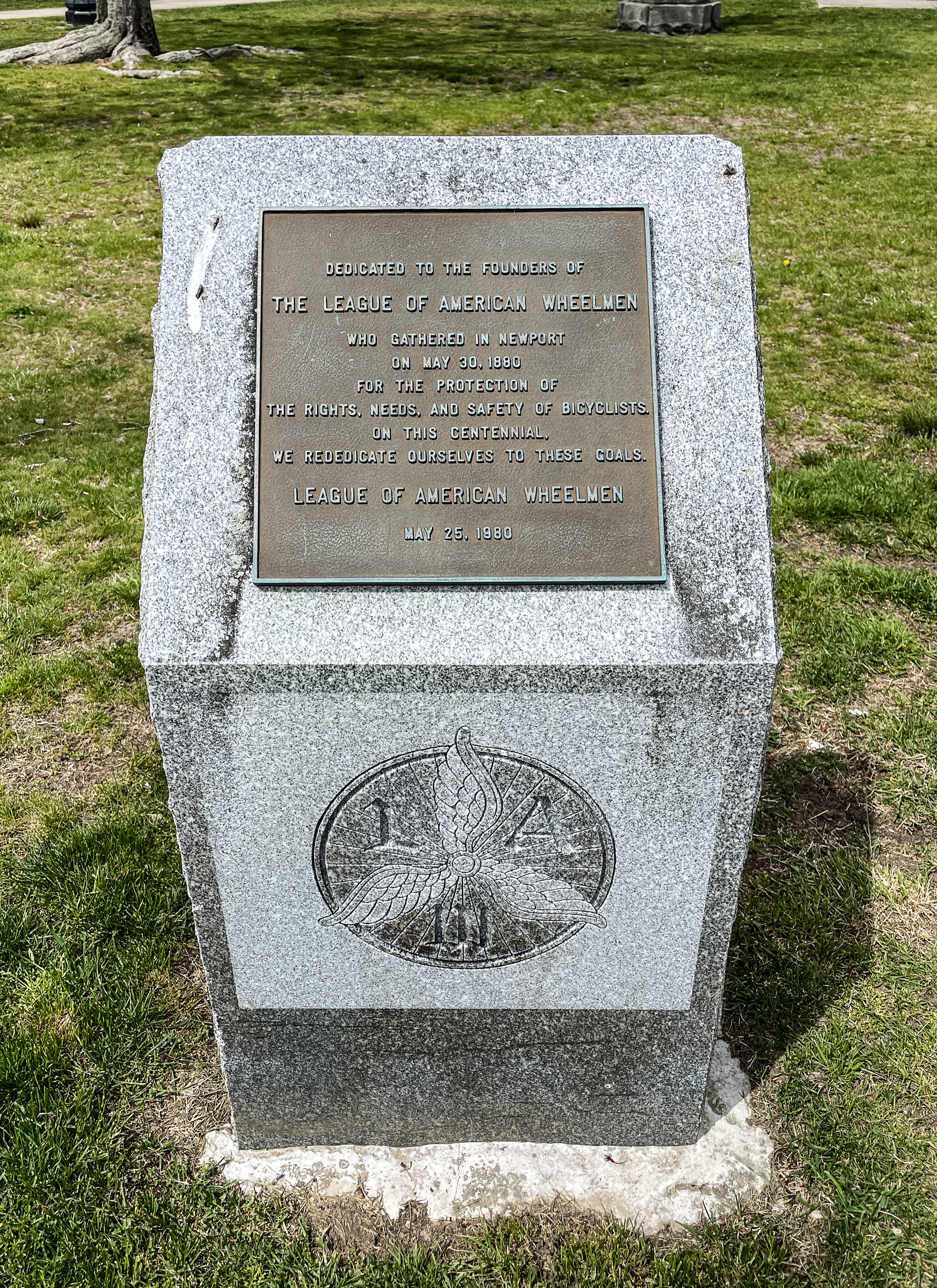
A memorial in Newport's Touro Park commemorates the centennial of the League's founding.

Founded in Newport, Rhode Island, on May 30, 1880, as the League of American Wheelmen by Kirk Munroe and Charles E. Pratt, it soon became the leading national membership organization for cyclists in the United States. The organization's first officers were Charles E. Pratt as president, T.K. Longstreet as vice president, O.S. Parsons as corresponding secretary, J.F. Furrell as recording secretary, and H.L. Willoughby as treasurer. The board of directors consisted of two from each state having regularly organization clubs.

Pratt served two terms as the organization's first president, from 1880 to 1882. He was the author in 1879 of the first cycling guidebook in the United States, The American Bicycler: a manual for the observer, the learner and the expert.

The League was also the governing body for amateur bicycle racing in the U.S. during the late 19th century. Membership peaked at 103,000 in 1898.

=== The 1880–1902 period ===
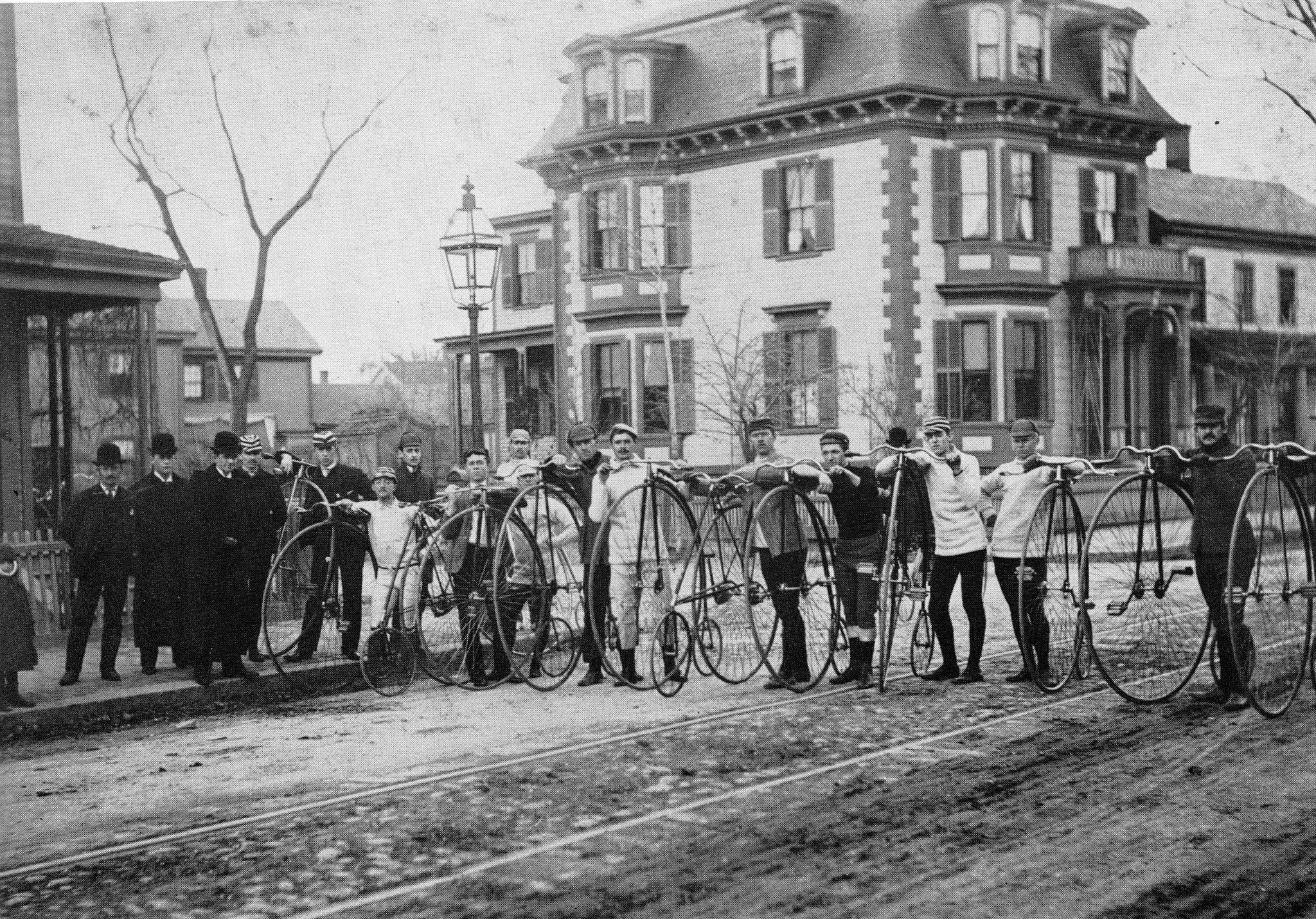
15-mile Penny Farthing Race, Harvard University Cycling Association in 1887

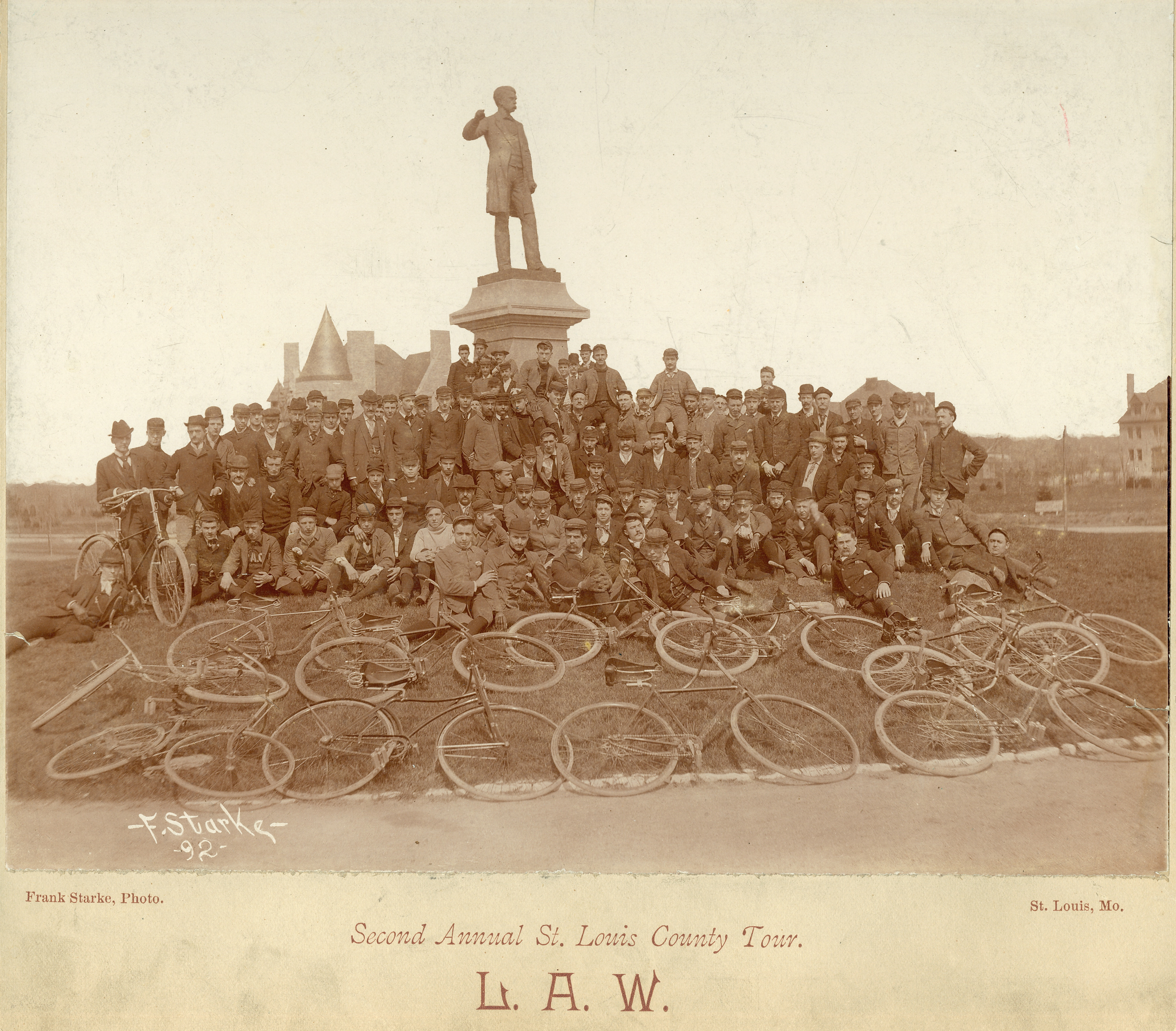
Bicyclists of the League of American Wheelmen pose before the second annual St. Louis County Bicycle Tour, 1892.

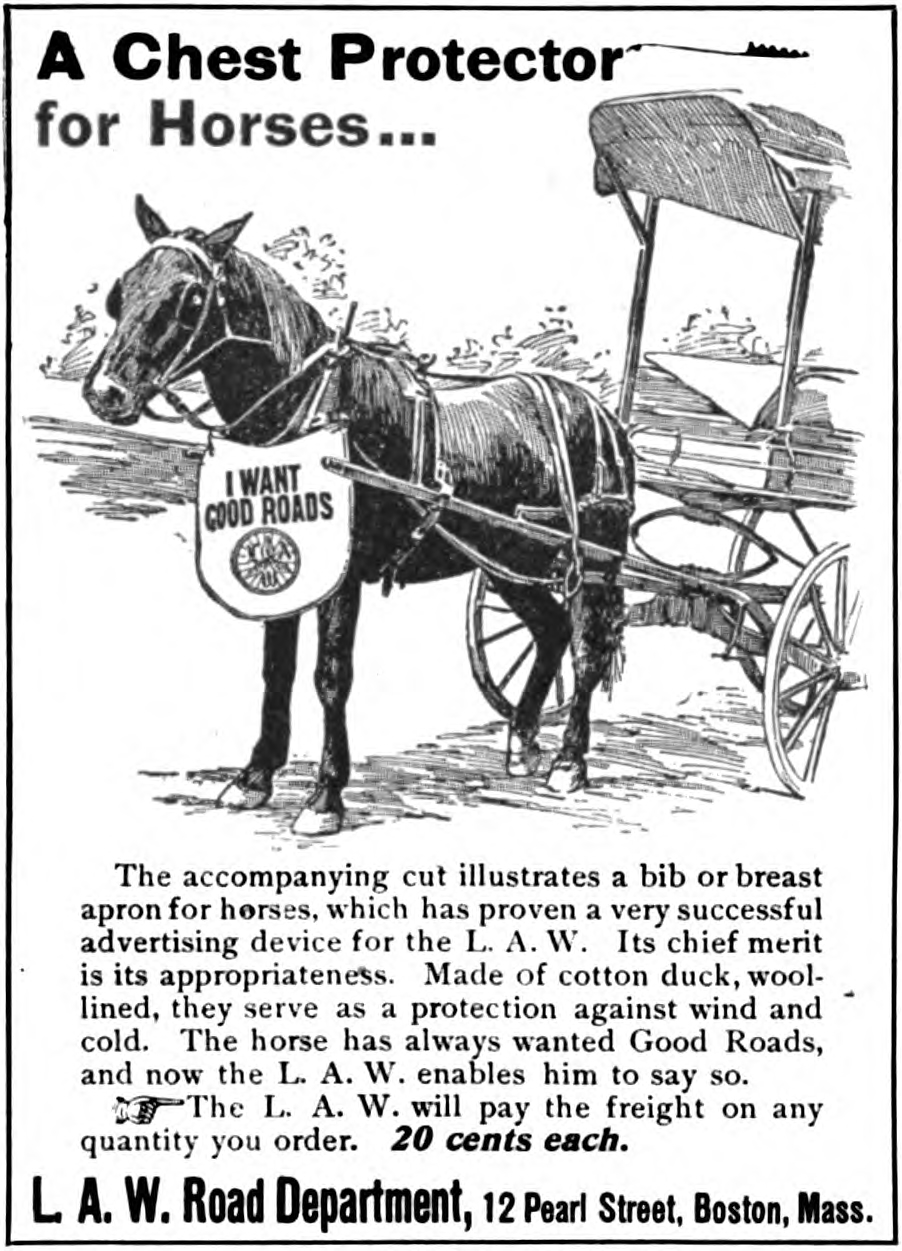
League of American Wheelman - Horse bibs - Good Roads, 1897

The League was a prominent advocacy group for the improvement of roads and highways in the United States long before the advent of the automobile. The Good Roads Movement in the late 19th century was founded and led by the League, which began publishing Good Roads magazine in 1892.

In the mid-1890s, bicycling became accessible to the population at large with the advent of the mass-produced, chain-driven safety bicycle. A huge boom in bicycle sales occurred, then collapsed as the market became saturated. Bicycle manufacturers were no longer able to support the League financially, and the interest of its members, largely well-to-do hobbyists, turned elsewhere.

In 1894, the League voted to prohibit membership by non-white people, pushed by southern members. Since the League was the governing body for bicycle racing at that time, the League's action effectively banned non-white people from most races in the United States. Local clubs had some discretion, as well as a separate racing league being set up, yet racism was still prevalent. Efforts were made in the following years to repeal the "white exclusive" clause, but an 1895 amendment to reverse the decision was dropped, as a "continued and energetic resistance" ensued before the original League dissolved in 1902. In 1999, a reformed League repealed the 1894 prohibition.

In 1897 the League included in its bylaws, “No race meeting shall receive official sanction if it is to be held on Sunday, or has upon its schedule any event which is open to women competitors”.

At its height in 1898, the League had over 103,000 members. Early members included three of the wealthiest men of the Gilded Age: Newport socialites John Jacob Astor, Diamond Jim Brady, and John D. Rockefeller.

Amateur bicycle racing declined with the rise of professional racing. League membership declined to 76,944 in 1900 and only 8,692 in 1902. The League dissolved that year, when there were still only a very few motorized vehicles on the roads. The American Automobile Association was founded the same year, 1902, and was, to an extent, a successor organization. It provided—and still provides—route information to members, as the League had provided. The League's Secretary, Abbott Bassett, produced a monthly publication under the League's name until 1924, but there was no League organization. Bassett's Scrap Book covered topics such as Frank W. Weston's role in developing cycling in Boston.

=== The 1939–1955 revival ===
Bicycle club activity revived and was particularly strong in the Chicago area during the Great Depression of the 1930s. Attempts to revive the League were initiated by representatives of the bicycle industry in 1933 and continued through the 1930s, and consisted primarily of a number of exhibitions and races under the League's name. Chicago-area bicycle clubs formed the core of a revived League governed by recreational cyclists in 1939 and which adopted a constitution in April 1942. This incarnation of the League was primarily a social organization, holding group rides and annual conventions. World War II contributed to the success of the League through rationing of motor vehicle fuel and tires. Membership was 614 in 1945, with 200 honorary members in the armed services. However, in the late 1940s, the League went into decline. Factors included the increasing availability of motor vehicles; the "baby boom", which made for difficulties in pursuing recreational cycling; narrow highways; and conformist social attitudes, with a perception of bicycling as a children's activity. Membership was only 507 in 1950 and 238 in 1953. The League dissolved again in 1955.

=== 1965–present ===
The League reorganized once again in 1965. By this time, highways had improved, the Eisenhower Interstate Highway System had drained traffic from many of them, and new interest in recreational cycling was spurred by the promotion of sports bicycles with derailleur gearing by the Schwinn Bicycle Company and others. Increasing awareness of the importance of physical fitness also contributed to the popularity of bicycling.

Through the end of the 20th century, the League existed as a national clearinghouse for cycling advocacy, but more so as a social organization, holding three or more regional rallies each year, usually in June, centered on public college campuses in various parts of the US. Each of these rallies featured mapped rides of various lengths, dormitory housing and meals, a variety of cycling-related lectures, and vendors selling products. At their peak, rallies would each attract as many as 2,000 cyclists.

With increasing popularity of bicycling, however, various other organizations adopted functions which the League dropped or did not pursue—most prominently, Bikecentennial (later renamed as the Adventure Cycling Association), which maps touring routes and provides services for touring bicyclists; the Rails-to-Trails Conservancy, which promotes conversion of abandoned rail lines to trails; and the Alliance for Biking and Walking (formerly Thunderhead Alliance), a loosely organized consortium of state and local advocacy organizations which maintains communication over the Internet.

In the late 20th century, the League was criticized for its name: League of American Wheelmen. Also, the term Wheelmen was becoming increasingly obscure. In response, the League began doing business as the League of American Bicyclists in 1994.

The League reached a peak of 24,000 paid memberships in 1997, then declined to around 20,000, where it has remained since (as of 2009), though it cites larger numbers by using a multiplier for family memberships and counting the approximately 300,000 members of affiliated bicycle clubs and advocacy organizations.

The League's rallies became less successful as bicyclists became able to find similar events closer to home. Beginning in 2003, the League would no longer organize its own rallies, but rather, would designate an existing event in one part of the country or another as its National Rally.

A major change in the direction of the League occurred in 1997 when it moved its offices from Baltimore, Maryland, to Washington, D.C., and focused increasingly on advocacy at the federal level. The League has shed most of the services it once provided to individual members, other than its magazine, and now is primarily an advocacy organization. Its major annual event is now the National Bicycle Summit.

Since the 1970s, the League has certified cycling instructors based on an education program that concentrates on practical bicycle handling and traffic skills. There were more than 1,000 active instructors as of 2009. The League's Bicycle Friendly America program distributes awards to communities which have adopted measures to accommodate and encourage bicycle use. The League also manages liability insurance programs for its instructors and for bicycle clubs.

== Advocacy ==
LAB advocates for cyclists at the national level, and organizes an annual National Bike Summit to bring professionals and advocates in Washington, D.C., together with government representatives. The Summit has attracted around 500 attendees in recent years (as of 2009).

In addition to PeopleForBikes, LAB works in partnership with other organizations such as America Bikes ("leveraging federal transportation dollars for bicycling", primarily with PeopleForBikes money), the Alliance for Bicycling and Walking (lobbies for government money to encourage bicycle usage while receiving substantial industry funding), Federal Highway Administration, the National Highway Traffic Safety Administration (NHTSA), NCUTCD and NCUTLO in order to "create a more bicycle-friendly America".

== Education ==
The League offers cycling education for adults and children in many locations across the U.S. Originally the education consisted of a single Effective Cycling (EC) course developed by John Forester and given to the League in 1976. Later, citing poor attendance and blaming the 30-hour length of the EC course, the League developed a curriculum consisting of multiple shorter courses. Forester did not agree with some of the changes to the program and withdrew permission for the League to use the EC name. The name of the League's program was then changed to "Bike Ed". In 2008, the program was renamed "Smart Cycling".

In addition to sponsoring the biennial "Bicycle Education Leaders Conference", the League is active in "Safe Routes to School" programs at a national level.

== Bicycle-friendly communities ==
As of May 2018, the League has formally recognized 450 communities across all 50 states as bicycle-friendly communities for "providing safe accommodation and facilities for bicyclists and encouraging residents to bike for transportation and recreation." These are the communities:

Diamond-level

- No Diamond-level communities.

Platinum-level - 5 Communities

- Boulder, Colorado
- Davis, California
- Fort Collins, Colorado
- Madison, Wisconsin
- Portland, Oregon

Gold-level - 33 Communities

- Ashland, Oregon
- Austin, Texas
- Bellingham, Washington
- Bloomington, Indiana
- Breckenridge, Colorado
- Cambridge, Massachusetts
- Carbondale, Colorado
- Chico, California
- Corvallis, Oregon
- Crested Butte, Colorado
- Durango, Colorado
- Eugene, Oregon
- Fayetteville, Arkansas
- Hilton Head Island, South Carolina
- Jackson and Teton County, Wyoming
- Menlo Park, California
- Minneapolis, Minnesota
- Missoula, Montana
- Palo Alto, California
- Park City, Utah
- San Francisco, California
- San Luis Obispo, California
- Santa Cruz, California
- Scottsdale, Arizona
- Seattle, Washington
- Somerville, Massachusetts
- Steamboat Springs, Colorado
- Tempe, Arizona
- Tucson, Arizona
- Urbana, Illinois
- The Villages, Florida
- Washington, DC
- Wood River Valley, Idaho

Silver-level - 90 Communities

- Ada County, Idaho
- Alexandria, Virginia
- Anchorage, Alaska
- Ann Arbor, Michigan
- Appleton, Wisconsin
- Arcata, California
- Arlington, Virginia
- Arvada, Colorado
- Aspen, Colorado
- Battle Creek, Michigan
- Beaverton, Oregon
- Bend, Oregon
- Boise, Idaho
- Bozeman, Montana
- Burlington, Vermont
- Calistoga, California
- Carrboro, North Carolina
- Champaign, Illinois
- Charlottesville, Virginia
- Chattanooga, Tennessee
- Chicago, Illinois
- Claremont, California
- Coeur d'Alene, Idaho
- Colorado Springs, Colorado
- Columbia, Missouri
- Coronado, California
- Cottonwood, Arizona
- Denver, Colorado
- Ellensburg, Washington
- Emeryville, California
- Evanston, Illinois
- Fitchburg, Wisconsin
- Flagstaff, Arizona
- Folsom, California
- Gainesville, Florida
- Glenwood Springs, Colorado
- Golden, Colorado
- Grand Marais, Minnesota
- Gresham, Oregon
- Gunnison, Colorado
- Henderson, Nevada
- Hennepin County, Minnesota
- Houghton, Michigan
- Iowa City, Iowa
- Irvine, California
- La Crosse, Wisconsin
- Las Vegas, Nevada
- Logan, Utah
- Long Beach, California
- Longmont, Colorado
- Louisville, Kentucky
- Marquette, Michigan
- Mesa, Arizona
- Miami Beach, Florida
- Moab City & Grand County, Utah
- Mountain View, California
- Nantucket, Massachusetts
- New Orleans, Louisiana
- New York City
- Oakland, California
- Oceanside, California
- Philadelphia, Pennsylvania
- Port Townsend, Washington
- Provincetown, Massachusetts
- Provo, Utah
- Redmond, Washington
- Sacramento, California
- Salida, Colorado
- Salt Lake City, Utah
- Sanibel, Florida
- Santa Barbara, California
- Santa Fe, New Mexico
- Santa Monica, California
- Sedona, Arizona
- Shorewood, Wisconsin
- Simsbury, Connecticut
- Sitka, Alaska
- Solana Beach, California
- South Bend, Indiana
- South Lake Tahoe, California
- St. Louis, Missouri
- St. Paul, Minnesota
- St. Petersburg, Florida
- Summit County Government, Colorado
- Tallahassee, Florida
- Vail, Colorado
- Venice, Florida
- West Sacramento, California
- Winter Park, Florida
- York, Pennsylvania

Bronze-level - 324 Communities

- Akron, Ohio
- Alameda, California
- Albany, Oregon
- Albuquerque, New Mexico
- Ames, Iowa
- Anacortes, Washington
- Arlington, Massachusetts
- Arroyo Grande, California
- Asheville, North Carolina
- Athens, Georgia
- Athens, Ohio
- Atlanta, Georgia
- Auburn, Alabama
- Aurora, Illinois
- Baltimore, Maryland
- Batavia, Illinois
- Bath, Maine
- Baton Rouge, Louisiana
- Bellevue, Washington
- Bemidji, Minnesota
- Bentonville, Arkansas
- Bethesda, Maryland
- Bettendorf, Iowa
- Bethlehem, Pennsylvania
- Billings, Montana
- Bismarck-Mandan, North Dakota
- Boca Raton, Florida
- Boone, North Carolina
- Brentwood, California
- Brookings, South Dakota
- Brookline, Massachusetts
- Broward County, Florida
- Brownsville, Texas
- Brunswick, Maine
- Buffalo, New York
- Camp Hill, Pennsylvania
- Cape Coral, Florida
- Carbondale, Illinois
- Carmel, Indiana
- Carrollton, Georgia
- Carson City, Nevada
- Cary, North Carolina
- Castle Rock, Colorado
- Cedar Falls, Iowa
- Cedar Rapids, Iowa
- Chandler, Arizona
- Chapel Hill, North Carolina
- Charlotte, North Carolina
- Chula Vista, California
- Cincinnati, Ohio
- Clackamas County, Oregon
- Clark County, Nevada
- Clayton, Missouri
- Clermont, Florida
- Cleveland, Ohio
- Cleveland Heights, Ohio
- Columbia, Maryland
- Columbia, South Carolina
- Columbus, Georgia
- Columbus, Indiana
- Columbus, Ohio
- Concord, New Hampshire
- Conway, Arkansas
- Coralville, Iowa
- Crosby, Minnesota
- Cupertino, California
- Dane County, Wisconsin
- Davidson, North Carolina
- Dayton, Ohio
- Decatur, Georgia
- DeKalb, Illinois
- Des Moines, Iowa
- Doral, Florida
- Dover, Delaware
- Dublin, Ohio
- Duluth, Minnesota
- Durham, North Carolina
- East Lansing, Michigan
- Eastern Placer County, California
- Eau Claire, Wisconsin
- Edina, Minnesota
- El Paso, Texas
- Elmhurst, Illinois
- Essex Junction, Vermont
- Eureka, California
- Fairfax County, Virginia
- Falmouth, Massachusetts
- Fargo, North Dakota-Moorhead, Minnesota
- Farmington, Connecticut
- Fergus Falls, Minnesota
- Ferguson, Missouri
- Fernandina Beach, Florida
- Flint, Michigan
- Fort Wayne, Indiana
- Fort Worth, Texas
- Franklin, Pennsylvania
- Frazee, Minnesota

Bronze-level, continued

- Frederick, Maryland
- Fresno, California
- Frisco, Texas
- Gilbert, Arizona
- Glastonbury, Connecticut
- Glenview, Illinois
- Goshen, Indiana
- Grand Junction, Colorado
- Grand Rapids, Michigan
- Grand Rapids, Minnesota
- Greater Grand Forks, South Dakota-Minnesota
- Greater Mankato, Minnesota
- Greater Wenatchee MPO, Washington
- Greeley, Colorado
- Greensboro, North Carolina
- Greenville, South Carolina
- Gulf Shores, Alabama
- Hagerstown, Maryland
- Hanover, New Hampshire
- Harrisonburg, Virginia
- Hartford, Connecticut
- Hattiesburg, Mississippi
- Healdsburg, California
- Helena, Montana
- Highland Park, Illinois
- Hoboken, New Jersey
- Honolulu, Hawaii
- Houston, Texas
- Hudson, Ohio
- Huntington Beach, California
- Hutchinson, Minnesota
- Indianapolis, Indiana
- Indian River County, Florida
- Inverness, Florida
- Ithaca, New York
- Jackson, Minnesota
- Jamestown S'Klallam Tribe of Washington
- Jekyll Island, Georgia
- Juneau, Alaska
- Kalamazoo, Michigan
- Kansas City, Missouri
- Keene, New Hampshire
- Kenmore, Washington
- Key Biscayne, Florida
- Kirkland, Washington
- Knoxville, Tennessee
- Lakeland, Florida
- Lakewood, Colorado
- Lakewood, Ohio
- Lambertville, New Jersey
- Lansing, Michigan
- Laramie, Wyoming
- Las Cruces, New Mexico
- Lawrence, Kansas
- Lebanon, New Hampshire
- Lee's Summit, Missouri
- Lewes, Delaware
- Lexington-Fayette County, Kentucky
- Lexington, Massachusetts
- Liberty Lake, Washington
- Lima, Ohio
- Lincoln, Nebraska
- Little Rock, Arkansas
- Los Alamos, New Mexico
- Los Altos, California
- Los Angeles, California
- Manhattan, Kansas
- Mansfield, Connecticut
- Memphis, Tennessee
- Menomonie, Wisconsin
- Mesquite, Nevada
- Miami, Florida
- Miami-Dade County, Florida
- Miami Shores, Florida
- Middleton, Wisconsin
- Midland, Michigan
- Milledgeville, Georgia
- Milton, Massachusetts
- Milwaukee, Wisconsin
- Monona, Wisconsin
- Montclair, New Jersey
- Montpelier, Vermont
- Morgantown, West Virginia
- Morro Bay, California
- Moscow, Idaho
- Muncie, Indiana
- Napa, California
- Naperville, Illinois
- Naples, Florida
- Nashville, Tennessee
- New Britain, Connecticut
- New Brunswick, New Jersey
- New Haven, Connecticut
- New Ulm, Minnesota
- Newark, Delaware
- Newport, Rhode Island
- Newton, Massachusetts
- Norfolk, Virginia
- Normal, Illinois
- Norman, Oklahoma
- North Little Rock, Arkansas
- Northampton, Massachusetts
- Northwest Arkansas-Benton and Washington Counties
- Oak Park, Illinois
- Oberlin, Ohio
- Ocean City, New Jersey
- Ogden, Utah
- Omaha, Nebraska
- Onalaska, Wisconsin
- Orange County, California
- Orem, Utah
- Orlando, Florida
- Oxford, Mississippi
- Paso Robles, California
- Peachtree City, Georgia
- Phoenix, Arizona
- Piqua, Ohio
- Pittsburgh, Pennsylvania
- Plano, Texas
- Pleasanton, California
- Port Angeles-Clallam County, Washington
- Portage, Michigan
- Portsmouth, New Hampshire
- Portsmouth, Virginia
- Prescott, Arizona
- Princeton, New Jersey
- Pueblo, Colorado
- Raleigh, North Carolina
- Rancho Cordova, California
- Rancho Cucamonga, California
- Reading, Pennsylvania
- Redding, California
- Redondo Beach, California
- Redwood City, California
- Reno-Sparks, Washoe County, Nevada
- Reston, Virginia
- Richardson, Texas
- Richfield, Minnesota
- Richmond, Virginia
- Ridgeland, Mississippi
- River Falls, Wisconsin
- Riverdale, Utah
- Riverside, California
- Roanoke, Virginia
- Rochester, Minnesota
- Rochester, New York
- Rock Hill, South Carolina
- Rockville, Maryland
- Rogers, Arkansas
- Roseburg, Oregon
- Roseville, California
- Roswell, Georgia,
- Salem, Oregon
- Salisbury, Maryland
- San Antonio, Texas
- San Carlos, California
- San Diego, California
- San Jose, California
- San Mateo, California
- San Mateo County, California
- San Buenaventura, California
- Santa Clara, California
- Santa Clarita, California
- Santa Rosa, California
- Savannah, Georgia
- Schaumburg, Illinois
- Sequim, Washington
- Shaker Heights, Ohio
- Shawnee, Kansas
- Sheboygan, Wisconsin
- Sierra Vista, Arizona
- Silverthorne, Colorado
- Sioux Falls, South Dakota
- Snohomish, Washington
- Sonoma, California
- South Lake County, Florida
- South Miami, Florida
- South San Francisco, California
- South Sioux City, Nebraska
- South Windsor, Connecticut
- Spartanburg, South Carolina
- Spokane, Washington
- Springboro, Ohio
- Springfield, Illinois
- Springfield, Missouri
- Springfield, Oregon
- St. Cloud, Minnesota
- St. George, Utah
- St. Louis Park, Minnesota
- State College - Centre Region, Pennsylvania
- Stevens Point, Wisconsin
- Stillwater, Oklahoma
- Sturgeon Bay, Wisconsin
- Sunnyvale, California
- Tacoma, Washington
- Tampa, Florida
- Temecula, California
- The Woodlands, Texas
- Thousand Oaks, California
- Topeka, Kansas
- Troy, Ohio
- Tulsa, Oklahoma
- Tybee Island, Georgia
- University Heights, Iowa
- Vancouver, Washington
- Vienna, Virginia
- Virginia Beach, Virginia
- Wake Forest, North Carolina
- Walla Walla, Washington
- Warrenville, Illinois
- Warsaw & Winona Lake, Indiana
- Washington, Illinois
- Watsonville, California
- Wausau, Wisconsin
- West Hartford, Connecticut
- West Windsor, New Jersey
- Westerville, Ohio
- Weston, Florida
- Wichita, Kansas
- Williamsburg, Virginia
- Willmar, Minnesota
- Wilmette, Illinois
- Wilmington, North Carolina
- Windsor, California
- Winona, Minnesota
- Winston-Salem, North Carolina
- Woodland, California
- Yellow Springs, Ohio
- Ypsilanti, Michigan
- Yuma, Arizona
- Zionsville, Indiana

== Bicycle-friendly universities ==
As of 2023, the league has formally recognized the following 221 universities, as bicycle-friendly institutions of higher education for "promoting and providing a more bikeable campus for students, staff and visitors." These are the universities:

Platinum-level - 9 Schools

- Boise State University - Boise, Idaho
- Colorado State University - Fort Collins, Colorado
- Portland State University - Portland, Oregon
- Stanford University - Stanford, California
- University of California, Davis - Davis, California
- University of California, Irvine - Irvine, California
- University of California, Santa Barbara - Santa Barbara, California
- University of Minnesota - Twin Cities, Minnesota
- University of Wisconsin–Madison - Madison, Wisconsin

Gold-level - 31 Schools

- Arizona State University - Tempe, Arizona
- Dartmouth College - Hanover, New Hampshire
- Dickinson College - Carlisle, Pennsylvania
- Georgia Institute of Technology - Atlanta
- Harvard University - Cambridge, Massachusetts
- Indiana University - Bloomington, Indiana
- Lees–McRae College - Banner Elk, North Carolina
- Michigan State University - East Lansing, Michigan
- Northern Arizona University - Flagstaff, Arizona
- Oregon State University - Corvallis, Oregon
- Pennsylvania State University - University Park, Pennsylvania
- Purdue University - West Lafayette, Indiana
- University of Arkansas - Fayetteville, Arkansas
- University of Arizona - Tucson, Arizona
- University of California, Berkeley - Berkeley, California
- University of California, Los Angeles - Los Angeles
- University of California, Santa Cruz - Santa Cruz, California
- University of Colorado Boulder - Boulder, Colorado
- University of Florida - Gainesville, Florida
- University of Kentucky - Lexington, Kentucky
- University of Maryland - College Park, Maryland
- University of Montana - Missoula, Montana
- University of Oregon - Eugene, Oregon
- University of Utah - Salt Lake City, Utah
- University of Vermont - Burlington, Vermont
- University of Washington - Seattle
- University of Wisconsin–Milwaukee - Milwaukee
- Utah State University - Logan, Utah
- Virginia Commonwealth University - Richmond, Virginia
- Virginia Tech - Blacksburg, Virginia
- Washington University in St. Louis - St. Louis,

Silver-level - 68 Schools

- Arkansas State University - Jonesboro, Arkansas
- Auburn University - Auburn, Alabama
- Brigham Young University - Provo, Utah
- Bowdoin College - Brunswick, Maine
- CSU Long Beach - Long Beach, California
- CSU Sacramento - Sacramento, California
- Carnegie Mellon University - Pittsburgh, Pennsylvania
- Champlain College - Burlington, Vermont
- Clemson University - Clemson, South Carolina
- Coastal Carolina University - Conway, South Carolina
- College of William & Mary - Williamsburg, Virginia
- Columbia University - New York City
- Concordia University - Moorhead, Minnesota
- Duke University - Durham, North Carolina
- Emory University - Atlanta, Georgia
- Florida State University - Tallahassee, Florida
- Franklin & Marshall College - Lancaster, Pennsylvania
- George Mason University - Fairfax, Virginia
- Grand Valley State University - Allendale, Michigan
- Illinois Wesleyan University - Bloomington, Illinois
- James Madison University - Harrisonburg, Virginia
- Keene State College - Keene, New Hampshire
- Louisiana State University - Baton Rouge, Louisiana
- Loyola Marymount University - Los Angeles, California
- Loyola University Chicago - Chicago, Illinois
- Macalester College - St. Paul, Minnesota
- MIT - Cambridge, Massachusetts
- Montana State University - Bozeman, Montana
- Morehead State University - Morehead, Kentucky
- New York University - New York City
- North Carolina State University - Raleigh, North Carolina
- Northwestern University - Evanston, Illinois
- Ohio State University - Columbus, Ohio
- Ohio University - Athens, Ohio
- Rice University - Houston
- Santa Monica College - Santa Monica, California
- School of the Art Institute of Chicago - Chicago
- Southern Illinois University - Carbondale, Illinois
- Southern Oregon University - Ashland, Oregon
- Temple University - Philadelphia
- Texas A&M University - College Station, Texas
- Texas Tech University - Lubbock, Texas
- University of Alaska Fairbanks - Fairbanks, Alaska
- University of California, San Diego - San Diego,
- University of Cincinnati - Cincinnati
- University of Colorado Colorado Springs - Colorado Springs, Colorado
- University of Illinois Chicago - Chicago
- University of Illinois Urbana-Champaign - Urbana-Champaign, Illinois
- University of Iowa - Iowa City, Iowa
- University of Louisville - Louisville, Kentucky
- University of Massachusetts Lowell - Lowell, Massachusetts
- University of Michigan - Ann Arbor, Michigan
- University of Michigan–Flint - Flint, Michigan
- University of Nebraska–Lincoln - Lincoln, Nebraska
- University of North Carolina at Chapel Hill - Chapel Hill, North Carolina
- University of North Carolina Wilmington - Wilmington, North Carolina
- University of Oklahoma - Norman, Oklahoma
- University of Pennsylvania - Philadelphia
- University of Pittsburgh - Pittsburgh
- University of Rochester - Rochester, New York
- University of South Carolina - Columbia, South Carolina
- University of South Florida - Tampa, Florida
- University of Texas at Austin - Austin, Texas
- University of Virginia - Charlottesville, Virginia
- University of Wisconsin–Stevens Point - Stevens Point, Wisconsin
- Vassar College - Poughkeepsie, New York
- Western Washington University - Bellingham, Washington
- Yale University - New Haven, Connecticut

Bronze-level - 114 Schools

- University of Alabama at Birmingham - Birmingham, Alabama
- Arizona State University, Downtown Campus - Phoenix, Arizona
- Arizona State University West campus - Glendale, Arizona
- Hendrix College - Conway, Arkansas
- University of Central Arkansas - Conway, Arkansas
- California Polytechnic State University - San Luis Obispo, California
- California Institute of Technology - Pasadena, California
- California State University, Bakersfield - Bakersfield, California
- California State University, Monterey Bay - Seaside, California
- California State University, Northridge - Northridge, California
- San Francisco State University - San Francisco
- University of California, Riverside - Riverside, California
- University of San Diego - San Diego, California
- University of San Francisco - San Francisco
- Colorado College - Colorado Springs, Colorado
- Colorado Mesa University - Grand Junction, Colorado
- Naropa University - Boulder, Colorado
- University of Denver - Denver
- University of Northern Colorado - Greeley, Colorado
- University of Connecticut, Mansfield, Connecticut
- American University - Washington, D.C.
- Georgetown University - Washington, D.C.
- Catholic University of America - Washington, D.C.
- Florida Institute of Technology - Melbourne, Florida
- University of Central Florida - Orlando, Florida
- University of Miami - Coral Gables, Florida
- University of South Florida St. Petersburg - St. Petersburg, Florida
- Columbus State University - Columbus, Georgia
- Georgia College & State University - Milledgeville, Georgia
- Kennesaw State University - Kennesaw campus - Kennesaw, Georgia
- Kennesaw State University - Marietta campus - Marietta, Georgia
- University of Georgia - Athens, Georgia
- University of West Georgia - Carrollton, Georgia
- City Colleges of Chicago - Chicago
- Illinois Institute of Technology - Chicago, Illinois
- Knox College - Galesburg, Illinois
- Southern Illinois University Edwardsville -Edwardsville, Illinois

Bronze-level, continued

- Alfred University - Alfred, New York
- Appalachian State University - Boone, North Carolina
- Aquinas College - Grand Rapids, Michigan
- Bemidji State University - Bemidji, Minnesota
- Bentley University - Waltham, Massachusetts
- Black Hills State University - Spearfish, South Dakota
- Boston University - Charles River campus - Boston, Massachusetts
- Boston University Medical Campus - Boston, Massachusetts
- Brown University - Providence, Rhode Island
- Chatham University - Pittsburgh, Pennsylvania
- College of Charleston - Charleston, South Carolina
- East Carolina University - Greenville, North Carolina
- Emporia State University - Emporia, Kansas
- George Mason University Arlington campus - Arlington, Virginia
- Gustavus Adolphus College - St. Peter, Minnesota
- Kansas State University - Manhattan, Kansas
- Kent State University - Kent, Ohio
- Lawrence Technological University - Southfield, Michigan
- Minnesota State Community and Technical College Fergus Falls - Fergus Falls, Minnesota
- Miami University - Oxford, Ohio
- Michigan Technological University - Houghton, Michigan
- Minnesota State University, Mankato - Mankato, Minnesota
- Monroe Community College - Rochester, New York
- Montgomery County Community College - Pottstown, Pennsylvania
- Nazareth College - Rochester, New York
- New Mexico State University - Las Cruces, New Mexico
- Norfolk State University - Norfolk, Virginia
- North Carolina Central University - Durham, North Carolina
- Northern Michigan University - Marquette, Michigan
- Oklahoma State University - Stillwater, Oklahoma
- Old Dominion University - Norfolk, Virginia
- Pennsylvania College of Technology - Williamsport, Pennsylvania
- Pomona College - Claremont, California
- Princeton University - Princeton, New Jersey
- Rochester Institute of Technology - Rochester, New York
- Salisbury University - Salisbury, Maryland
- Savannah College of Art and Design - Savannah, Georgia
- Shippensburg University - Shippensburg, Pennsylvania
- St. Lawrence University - Canton, New York
- University at Buffalo, The State University of New York - Buffalo, New York
- State University of New York at Cortland - Cortland, New York
- SUNY College of Environmental Science and Forestry - Syracuse, New York
- State University of New York at Stony Brook - Stony Brook, New York
- Texas State University - San Marcos, Texas
- The College at Brockport, State University of New York - Brockport, New York
- Towson University - Towson, Maryland
- Transylvania University - Lexington, Kentucky
- Truman State University - Kirksville, Missouri
- Tufts University - Medford and Somerville, Massachusetts
- University of Central Oklahoma - Edmond, Oklahoma
- University of Dayton - Dayton, Ohio
- University of Illinois Springfield - Springfield, Illinois
- University of Kansas - Lawrence, Kansas
- University of Louisiana at Lafayette - Lafayette, Louisiana
- University of Memphis - Memphis, Tennessee
- University of Mississippi - Oxford, Mississippi
- University of Missouri-Kansas City - Kansas City, Missouri
- University of Nevada, Reno - Reno, Nevada
- University of New England - Biddeford, Maine
- University of New Mexico - Albuquerque, New Mexico
- University of North Carolina, Charlotte - Charlotte, North Carolina
- University of North Carolina, Greensboro - Greensboro, North Carolina
- University of North Texas - Denton, Texas
- University of Toledo - Toledo, Ohio
- University of Tulsa - Tulsa, Oklahoma
- University of Wisconsin–Eau Claire - Eau Claire, Wisconsin
- University of Wisconsin–La Crosse - La Crosse, Wisconsin
- University of Wisconsin-Stout - Menomonie, Wisconsin
- University of Wyoming - Laramie, Wyoming
- Vanderbilt University and Vanderbilt University Medical Center - Nashville, Tennessee
- Washtenaw Community College - Ann Arbor, Michigan
- West Virginia University - Morgantown, West Virginia

Honorable mentions

- Central Baptist College - Conway, Arkansas
- Farmingdale State College - East Farmingdale, New York
- SUNY New Paltz - New Paltz, New York

== See also ==
- Phyllis Harmon
- Albert Augustus Pope
- San Francisco Bicycle Coalition
- Sacramento Area Bicycle Advocates
- World Cycling Alliance
