= Hotel Agassiz =

Building in Boston, Massachusetts, US

Coordinates: 42.3518°N 71.0803°W

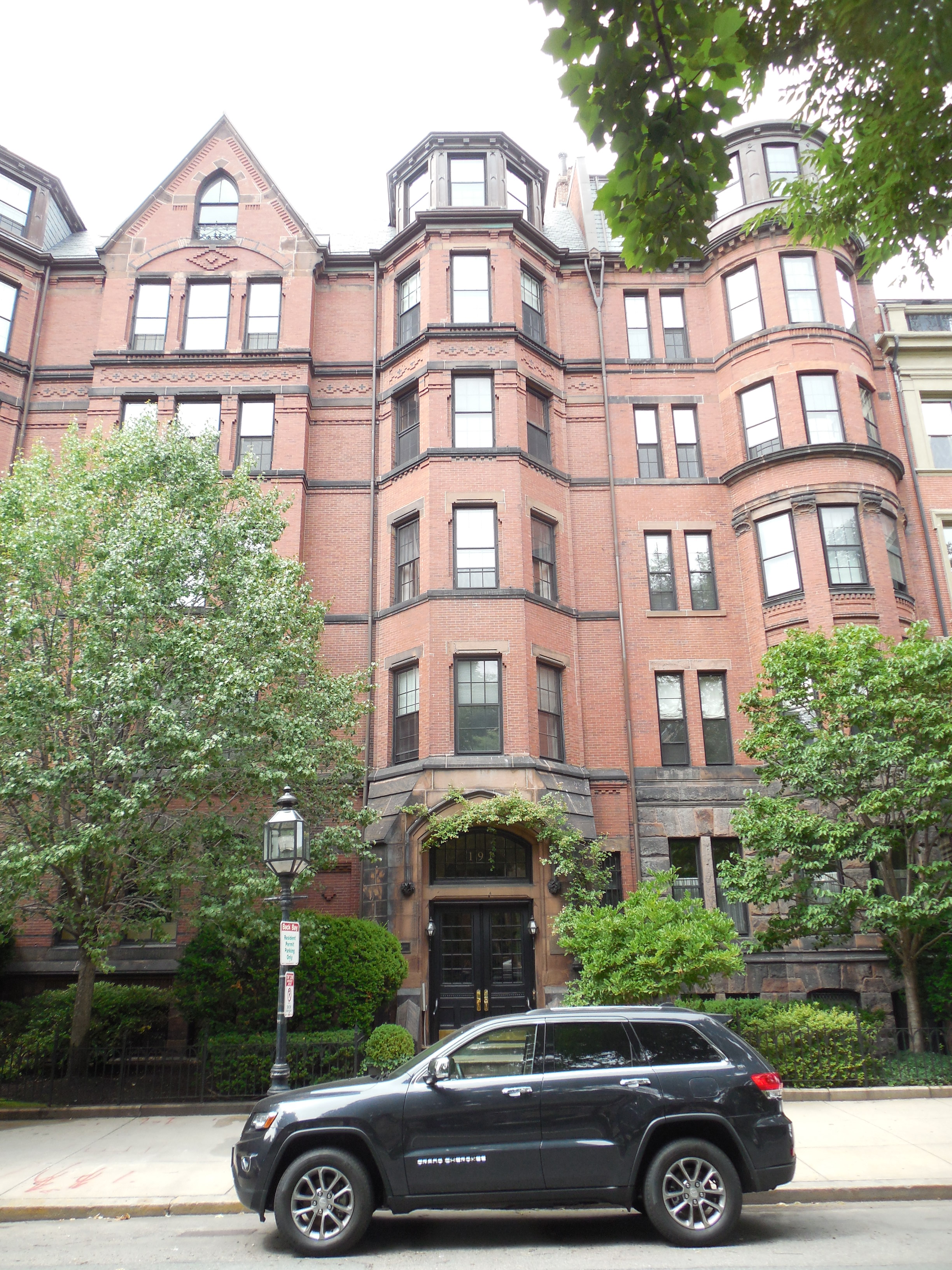
191 Commonwealth Avenue

Hotel Agassiz is a historic building in Boston designed by Weston & Rand and built in 1872. It is located at 191 Commonwealth Avenue in the Back Bay. The building was designed for Alexander Agassiz (son of Harvard University naturalist Louis Agassiz) and his brother-in-law Henry Lee Higginson (son of George Higginson who founded the Boston Symphony Orchestra. Alexander Agassiz was the developer and president of the Calumet Mine and Hecla Copper Mines.
