= Essex Town Hall and TOHP Burnham Library =

Coordinates: 42.63173°N 70.78341°W

- U.S. National Register of Historic Places
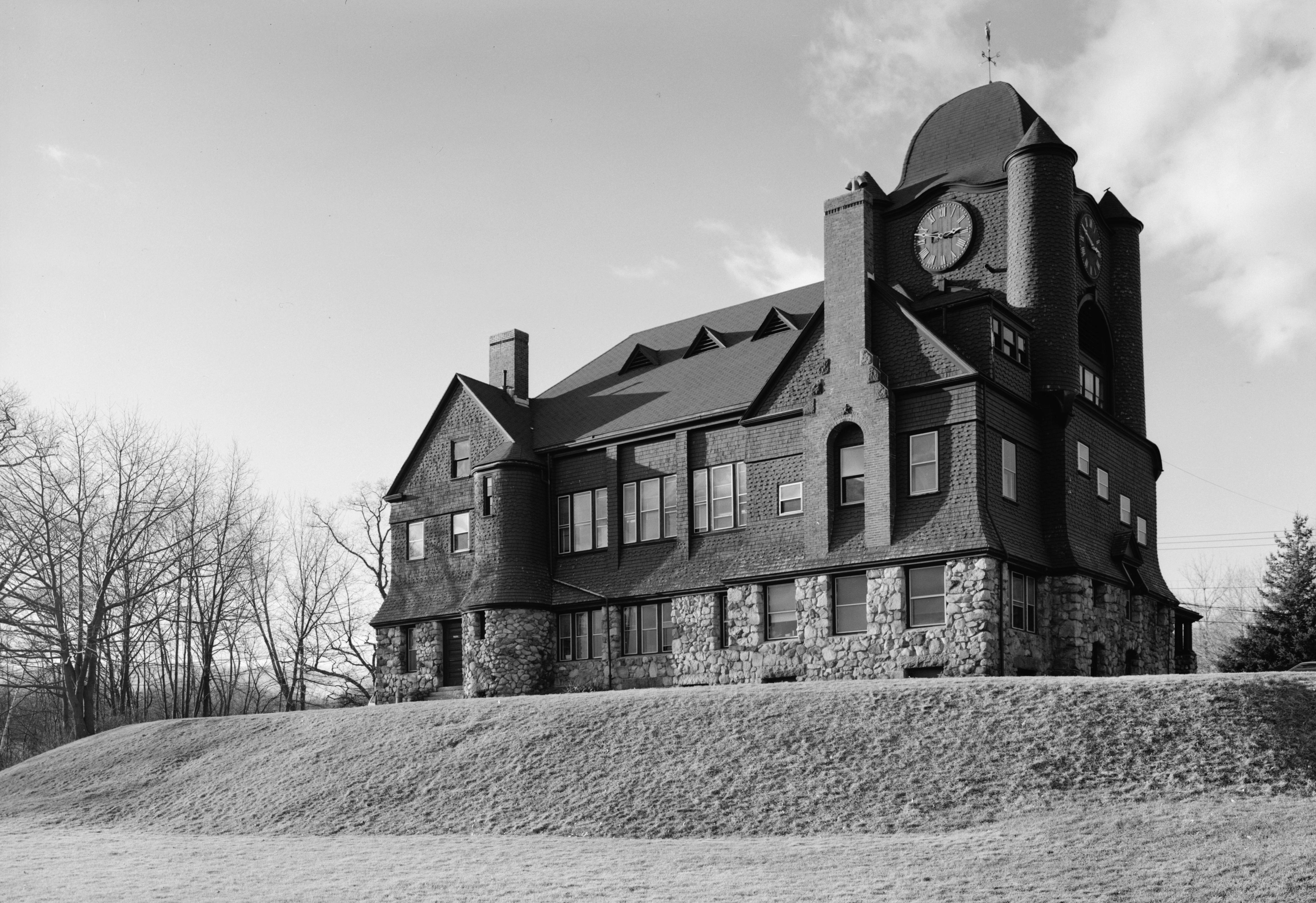

- Location within Massachusetts Location within the United States
- Location: Essex, Massachusetts
- Built: 1893-94
- Architect: Frank W. Weston; Arthur Asahel Shurcliff (landscape architect)
- Architectural style: Shingle Style
- NRHP reference No.: 07000946
- Added to NRHP: September 12, 2007

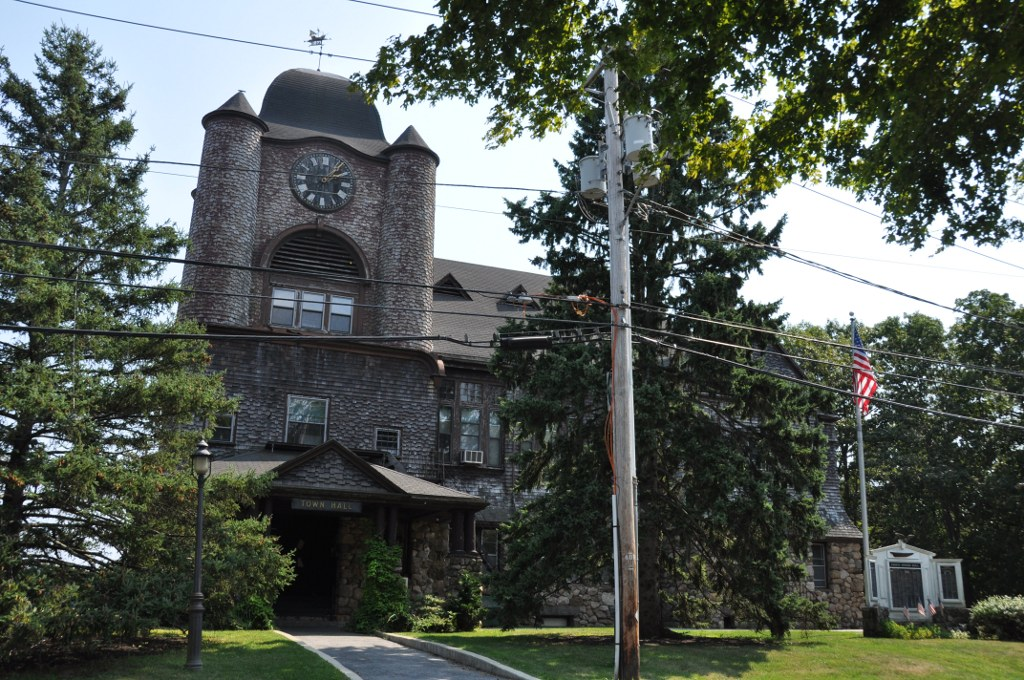
Essex Town Hall and Library

The Essex Town Hall and TOHP Burnham Library is an exuberant Shingle Style building at 30 Martin Street in Essex, Massachusetts in the United States. Containing town offices, a public library and an auditorium, it was built in 1893-1894, and its architect was Frank W. Weston, of Boston and Malden, Massachusetts.

The new building was described in the March 1894 issue of The Library Journal:

Essex (Mass). Public Library, The new town-hall and library building was dedicated on the afternoon of Feb. 15. A large audience was present at the dedication exercises, which included an oration by Rev. D.O Mears, music, several short addresses, and the reading of poems. In the evening there was a concert, followed by dancing.

The building which combines town-hall and library has just been completed after plans by Frank W. Weston, a Malden architect. The lower story is built of field-stone, and the upper part, including the tower, of wood. The interior is finished in antique oak, and the walls are painted in hues of brown and yellow. In the upper story is situated the town-hall proper. It has a seating capacity for 550. There is a stage and a gallery which will allow of entertainments being given there. One-half of the lower floor is devoted to the library, and will accommodate several thousand books. From the entrance there is a hallway that turns abruptly to the right, and on this passage are doors leading to the offices of the selectmen, the treasurer, and other officials. There are three entrances to the building, the main entrance being through an attractive carriageway into a spacious vestibule.

In the tower is the clock, with chime-bells, which strike the hour, presented to the town by L. G. Burnham.

Both the land and the building were gifts of the late T.O.H.P Burnham, of Boston, who was a native of Essex. Mr. Burnham died in 1891, and by his will the town received $30,000, half of which was for the town and the other half for a public library. Previous to this the town had come into possession of $5000 through the will of the late Dr. J. D. Russ, also a native of Essex. It was decided to build the town-hall and the library together.

The building was added to the National Register of Historic Places in 2007.

== See also ==
- National Register of Historic Places listings in Essex County, Massachusetts
