= Sacramento Area Bicycle Advocates =

The Sacramento Area Bicycle Advocates (SABA) is a nonprofit bicycle advocacy organization serving the Sacramento, California area. SABA was formed in 1991, and was incorporated as a 501(c)(3) nonprofit organization in 2003. SABA has more than 1,400 members in the counties served by the Sacramento Area Council of Governments, the local Metropolitan Planning Organization. Membership is concentrated in Sacramento County. SABA has a chapter in the city of Folsom.

== Accomplishments ==
SABA has a long record of accomplishment in getting bike facilities built and bicycling considered in policies and planning. Facilities include the Sunrise Corridor Bikeway, Highway 50 overcrossing at Aerojet, Hornet Crossing at California State University, Sacramento, Lake Natoma Trail, Ueda Parkway Trail, Sacramento Northern Bikeway, the Dry Creek Trail, and road diets/reversions of streets back to two-way traffic in midtown Sacramento. SABA has been involved in the Sacramento City/County 2010 Bikeway Master Plan, the City/County Bicycle Advisory Committee, bicycle access to Sacramento Regional Transit buses and light rail, a bicycle access study for the Los Rios Community College system, bicycle funding in the Metropolitan Transportation Plan and a host of other issues.
