= Frank W. Weston =

English-born American architect

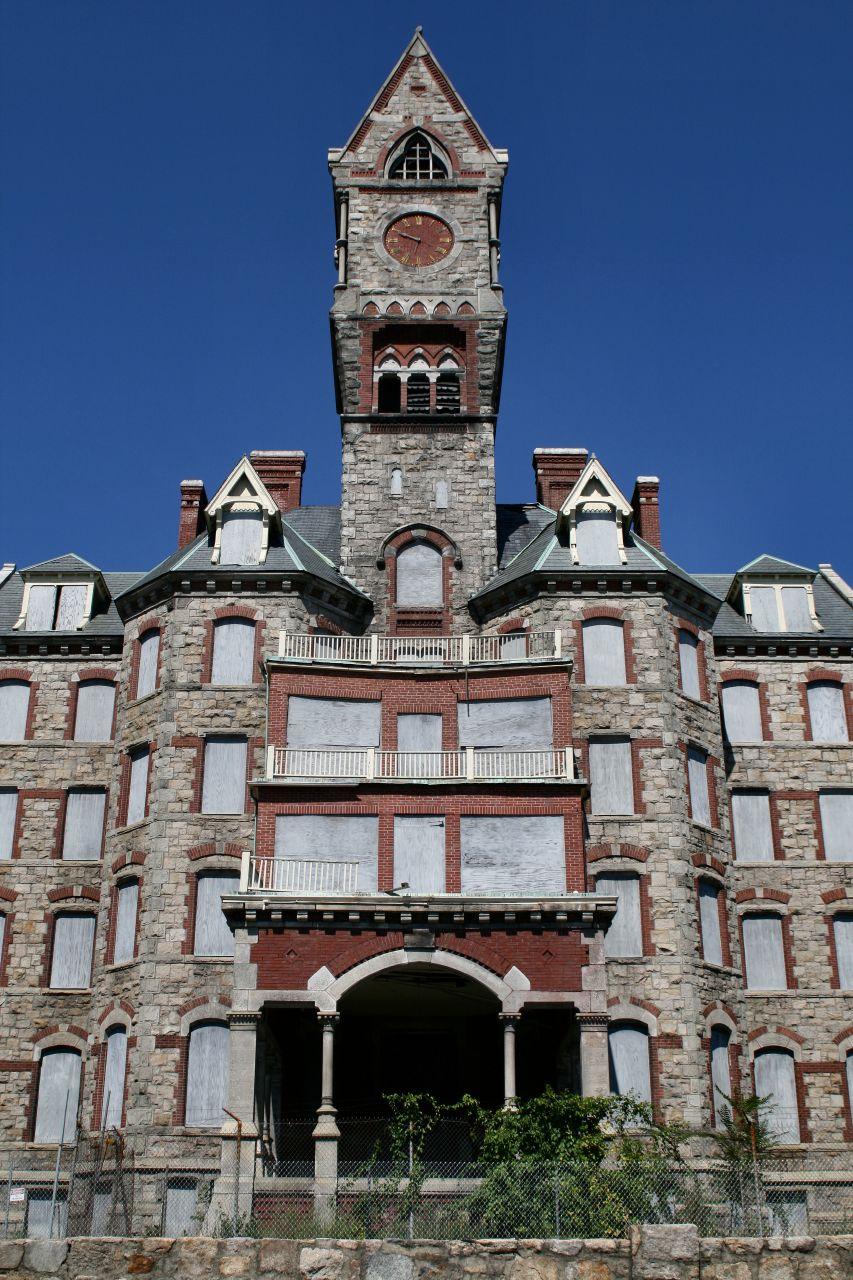
Massachusetts Insane Hospital at Worcester

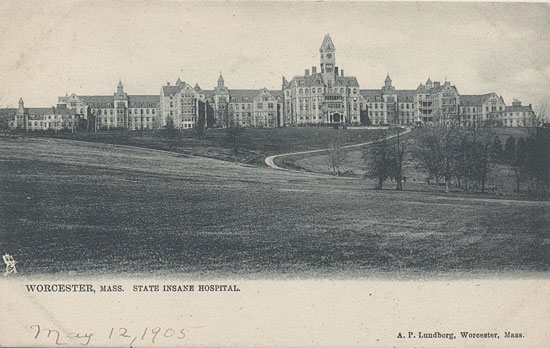
The Asylum pictured on a postcard dated 1905

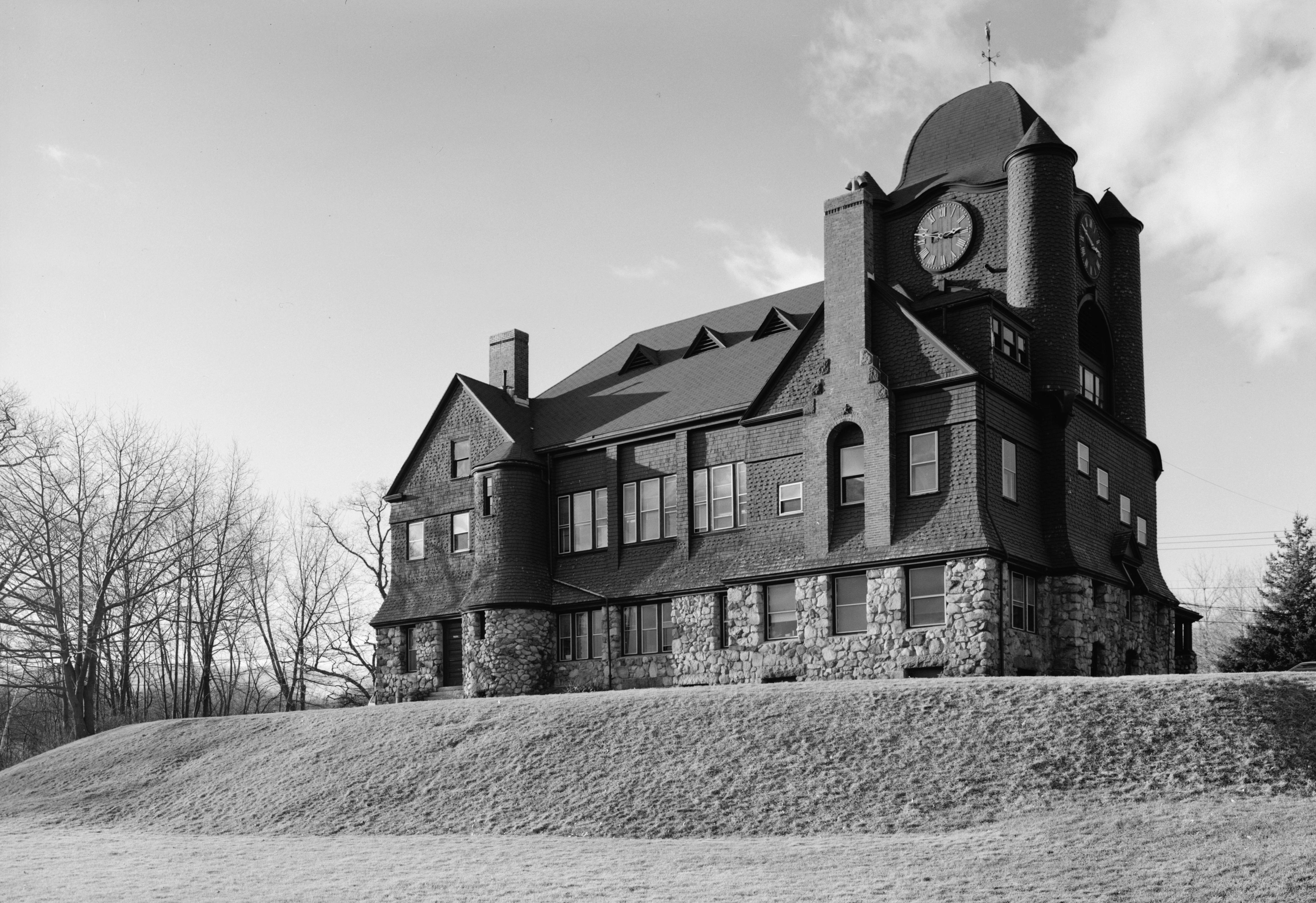
Essex Town Hall and TOHP Burnham Library, Essex, Massachusetts (1893-94)

Frank W. Weston (1843–1911) was an English-born and trained architect who practiced in Portland, Maine and Boston, Massachusetts. He also invested in the bicycle industry and promoted cycling as a sport. He was the co-founder of the Boston Bicycling Club is known as the "father of American bicycling."

== Early years ==
Frank Weston was born July 13, 1843, in the Oxford Terrace, England. He studied at private schools before training as an architect. He emigrated from England to the United States, arriving in Boston on June 1, 1866.

== Architecture ==
Weston went to work in Boston for William Ralph Emerson in the Studio building. He relocated to Portland, Maine after a fire in that city on July 4, 1866. He assisted with the rebuilding of the city. He remained in Portland for two years before returning to Boston, where he worked for N.J. Bradlee. He started his own firm in 1869, and in 1870, formed a partnership with George Rand. The firm of Weston and Rand designed the Hotel Agassiz at 191 Commonwealth Avenue (1872) and a building at 270 Clarendon Street (1873). Weston worked on many homes on the Boston Back Bay, and he built a house for himself at Savin Hill. He lived there with his wife, whom he married in 1873.

Weston worked as an architect out of Malden and Boston. He designed the Essex Town Hall and TOHP Burnham Library at 30 Martin Street in Essex, Massachusetts, built in the Shingle style of architecture. It is listed on the National Register of Historic Places. He also designed the Massachusetts Insane Hospital in Worcester, the New England Telephone & Telegraph Company exchange building on Oxford Street in Lynn, Massachusetts, and a "boxy Queen Anne style house."

== Bicycles and cycling ==
In 1877, Frank Weston formed a business partnership with Arthur Cunningham, Sidney Heath, and Harold Williams to import bicycles to the United States. The new firm, Cunningham, Heath, and Company, started a bicycle riding school when it received its first order of high-wheelers from England. Weston withdrew from active management of the firm and founded the American Bicycling Journal, which he used to promote the sport of cycling and the interests of the firm. First issued Dec. 22, 1877, it was the first periodical of its kind in the United States. Weston sold the magazine in 1879 to Charles Pratt and Edward C. "Ned" Hodges.

In February 1878, Weston and thirteen fellow cyclists launched the Boston Bicycle Club, the first club of its kind in the United States. Weston was also the first and only American of the Cyclists' Touring Club of England, originally the Bicycle Touring Club. He organized races, one hundred-mile bicycle club runs and "the first hundred mile tricycle club run" in the United States. Weston served as first vice-president of the League of American Wheelmen and president of the Pioneers of the League of American Wheelmen.

== Death ==
Weston died at the age of 67 in 1911. His wishes were for his body to be cremated and his ashes mixed with those of his wife. In 1926 it was discovered that this had not happened, and that his ashes were still in the undertaker's storage room. The members of the Boston Bicycling Club could not located his wife's ashes, but decided to scatter his at the Fairbanks House in Dedham, Massachusetts, a favorite spot of the club's, under a tree that had been planted there on the occasion of the club's 40th anniversary.
