= James (ship) =

The ship James made several trips during the early 17th century Great Migration out of England to the New World. It is unclear how many ships were named James during the Great Migration, as the name James was very popular in England during the reign of James I of England (1567–1625).

== 1621-1622 voyage ==
From England to Virginia

It appears the James landed right around the New Year, because some of the passengers reported as landing in 1621, and others in 1622, most likely due to winter conditions. The first few off the ship were servants of Edward Bennett, the wealthy London merchant that had paid for over 800 servants to travel to the New World to work his plantations, and who had already established his plantation, so they had a place to stay.

Passengers:

1621:

- William Bradford
- Wassell Webling, servant to Edward Bennett
- Antonio a Negro, servant to Edward Bennett

1622:

Isack Chaplaine arrived in Virginia in 1610 aboard the Starr and then sent for his family ten years later, as they arrived on the James:

- Mary Chaplaine, wife of Isack Chaplaine
- John Chaplaine, age 15, son of Isack Chaplaine
- John Duffhill, age 14, servant for Isack Chaplaine
- Robert Hudson, age 30, servant for Isack Chaplaine
- Henry Thorne age 18, servant for Isack Chaplaine
- Ivy Banton, maid for Isack Chaplaine

The other passengers include;

- Grivell Pooley, minister
- John Bamford, age 23, servant for Abraham Peirsey
- Richard English, servant for Thomas Palmer, who arrived months earlier on the Tyger
- Richard Appleton, age 19, one of William Tucker's men
- Lawrence Evans, age 15, servant for Nathaniel Cawsey, who arrived on the Phoenix in 1607
- William Popleton, servant for John Davies, who arrived on the George in 1617
- Nicholas Sutton, dead at Chaplans Choise, slain by Indians 1624
- Anthony West (1606-1654), hired for Treasurers Plantation

== 1624 voyage ==
James left Bermuda with master Toby Ffolgate at the helm, and arrived in Virginia.

The information below (1633) is not correct. Captain Wiggin was not "at the helm" of the James. Wiggin did not "command an earlier expedition to this area". He came in 1630 as an agent for the Bristol Merchants and then in 1633 for the two Lords and a group of men collectively called "Shrewsbury Merchants" along with William Whiting and Willis who had shares in the venture. William Whiting came in 1633 on the James with Capt. Wiggin and his second wife, Catherine Whiting, sister to William Whiting.

== 1633 voyage ==
James left Gravesend, England, with master Captain Thomas Wiggin at the helm, and arrived in Salem, Massachusetts on October 10, 1633. The James was described as a relatively small but sturdy ship, carrying 100 Pilgrims along with horses, cattle, goats and provisions landed at Salem on October 10, 1633. After disembarking, Captain Wiggin and 30 others sailed further up the coast to Hilton Point, what is now known as Dover, New Hampshire, and started a new settlement. Wiggin, a strict Puritan, commanded one of the early explorations to New Hampshire during this period and was appointed by English entrepreneurs to make land acquisitions and organize potential settlers.

== 1635 voyages ==
The ship James of London sailed from Southampton on April 5, 1635 and arrived in Massachusetts Bay on June 3, 1635 with master William Cooper at the helm.

The ship James left King's Road in Bristol on May 23, 1635 with master John Taylor at the helm. From England to Massachusetts in a fleet of five ships, the Angel Gabriel, the Elizabeth and Ann (Bess), the Mary and the Diligence.

On June 3, 1635, the James joined four other ships, and set sail for the New World with just over 100 passengers as part of a fleet of five ships, including the families of Richard Mather, Captain John Evered, John Greene and John Ayer. As they approached New England, a hurricane struck and they were forced to ride it out just off the coast of modern-day Hampton, New Hampshire. According to the ship's log and the journal of Increase Mather, whose father Richard Mather and family were passengers, the following was recorded;

"At this moment,... their lives were given up for lost; but then, in an instant of time, God turned the wind about, which carried them from the rocks of death before their eyes. ...her sails rent in sunder, and split in pieces, as if they had been rotten ragges..."

They tried to stand down during the storm just outside the Isles of Shoals, but lost all three anchors, as no canvas or rope would hold, but on Aug 13, 1635, torn to pieces, and with not one death, all one hundred plus passengers on the James managed to make it to Boston Harbor two days later.

The Angel Gabriel was wrecked off the coast of Maine, but the smaller, faster ships, the Mary, the Bess, and the Diligence outran the storm, and landed in Newfoundland on August 15, 1635.

== 1662 voyage ==
The James left Bermuda on August 5, 1662 with Captain William Sayle and James Sayle under the command of Matthew Normal in search of Eleutheria.

== 1733 voyage ==
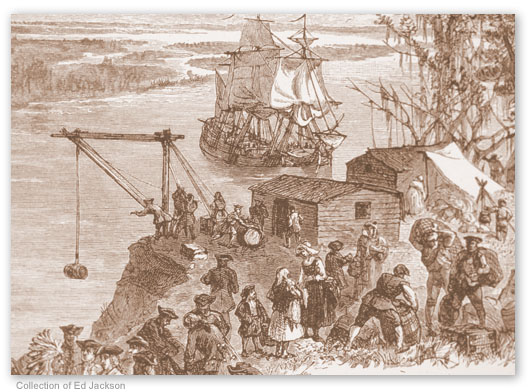
The unloading of the James, 1733

According to Georgian History, the James was the first ship to be unloaded at Savannah.

== James (1787 ship) ==
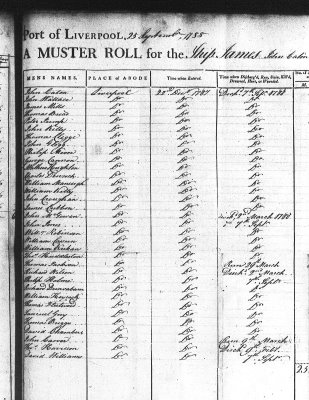
The Ship James Muster Roll, December 25, 1788

On December 22, 1787, James, under Captain George Canton (or Caton), sailed from Liverpool to Jamaica as a cargo ship, arriving February 9, 1788. They unloaded the beef, and loaded up with the sugar cargo bound for Charleston, South Carolina. They arrived in Charleston where they unloaded. They then reloaded with cotton for to Liverpool on September 7, 1788.

Just three months later, on December 16, 1788, under Captain Thomas Wilks embarked on the same cargo trip, arriving back in Liverpool on July 24, 1789.

== James (1789 ship) ==
James, of 450 ton (bm), was launched in 1777 in France. She entered Lloyd's Register in 1779.

== James (1806 ship) ==
James, of 196 (bm), was launched in Spain in 1802, almost certainly under another name. She was captured in 1804. James first appeared in Lloyd's Register (LR) and the Register of Shipping (RS) in 1806. She became a slave ship in the triangular trade in enslaved people. She was armed with six 9-pounder guns and six 12-pounder carronades 1st enslaving voyage (1806–1807): Captain Robert Tyrer sailed from Liverpool on 2 February 1806 and started acquiring slaves on the Gold Coast on 13 April. James left Africa on 6 June and arrived at St Vincent on 28 July, where she sold her captives. She sailed from St Vincent on 7 November and arrived back at Liverpool on 17 January 1807. She had left Liverpool with 28 crew members and she suffered one crew death on her voyage. The Slave Trade Act 1807, which forbade British vessels from engaging in the slave trade, was passed on 25 March 1807, and took effect on 1 May 1807. The act also required that the voyage be completed before 30 March 1808. 2nd enslaving voyage (1807–1808): Captain William Thompson sailed from Liverpool on 28 March, that is, after the Act had passed, but before it took effect. His voyage was therefore legal. James acquired slaves at Gabon, and arrived at Barbados with 221 captives on 4 December, well before the deadline of 30 March 1808. She landed 28 and then sailed on to Demerara. Fate: After James arrived at Demerara she was condemned. LR for 1808 carried the annotation "condemned".

== Other ships named James ==
- HMS James, several ships
- USS James, a World War I steam trawler
- USCGC James, a U.S. Coast Guard Legend-class cutter
- James (HBC vessel), operated by the HBC from 1682-1683, see Hudson's Bay Company vessels
