= Pemaquid Point Light =

Lighthouse in Maine, US

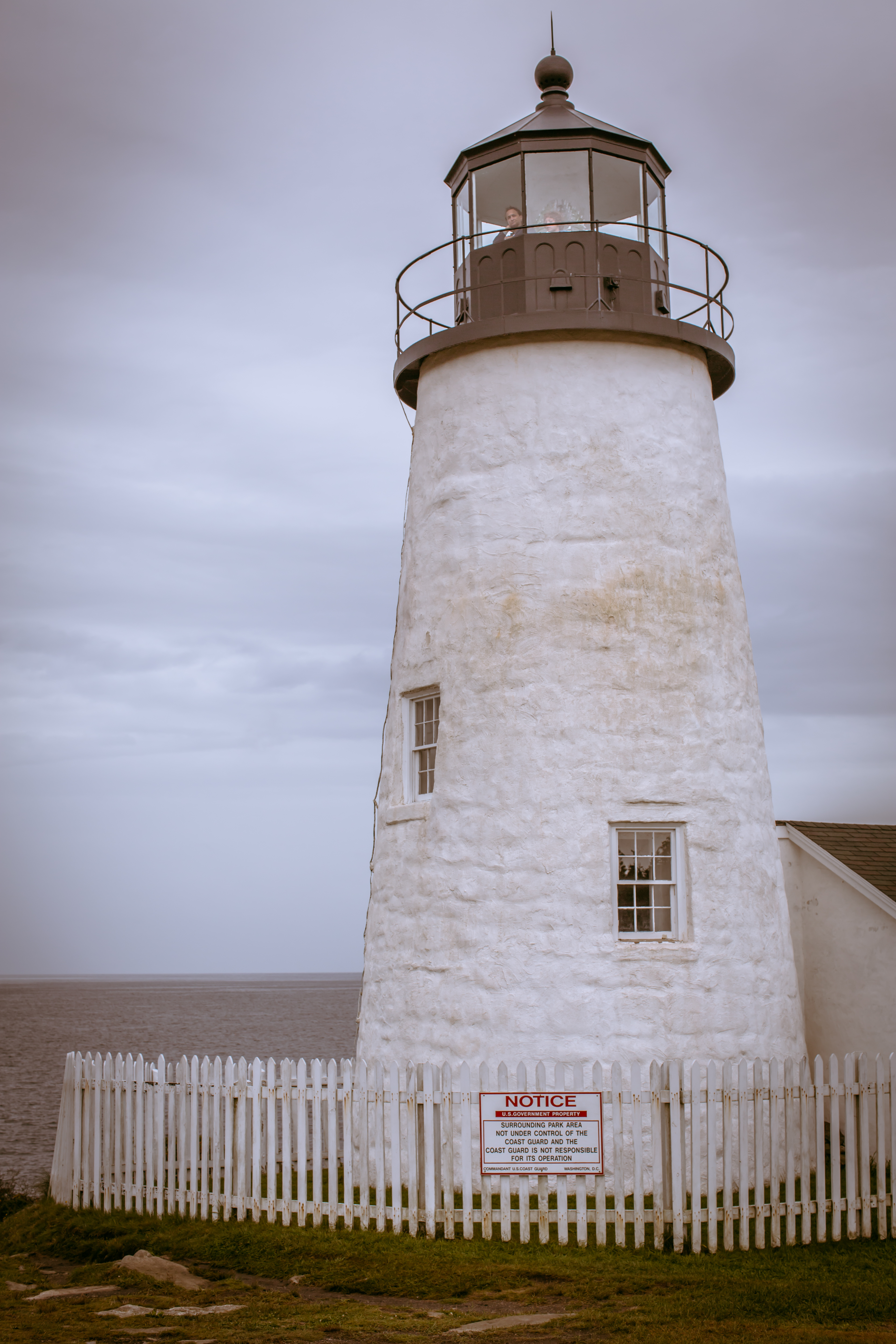
- Location: Pemaquid Point, entrance to Muscongus Bay, Bristol, Maine
- Coordinates: 43°50′13.03″N 69°30′21.77″W

Tower
- Constructed: 1827
- Foundation: Natural Emplaced
- Construction: Rubble stone and concrete
- Automated: 1934
- Height: 11.5 m (38 ft)
- Shape: conical
- Markings: white with black lantern
- Heritage: National Register of Historic Places listed place

Light
- First lit: 1857 (current tower)
- Focal height: 79 feet (24 m)
- Lens: Fourth order Fresnel lens
- Range: 14 nautical miles (26 km; 16 mi)
- Characteristic: Flashing white 6 s
- Pemaquid Point Light
- U.S. National Register of Historic Places
- Area: 0.3 acres (0.12 ha)
- Built: 1835
- NRHP reference No.: 85000843
- Added to NRHP: April 16, 1985

The Pemaquid Point Light is a historic U.S. lighthouse located in Bristol, Lincoln County, Maine, at the tip of the Pemaquid Neck.

== History ==
The lighthouse was commissioned in 1827 by President John Quincy Adams and built that year. Because of poor workmanship (salt water was used in the mortar mix), the lighthouse began to crumble and was replaced in 1835. The second contract for the construction stipulated that only fresh water be used. Keeper Isaac Dunham oversaw the construction and wrote in a letter to the US Lighthouse Establishment that the agreement was upheld and the work went well.

The original light was an Argand-Lewis parabolic reflector, lit with candles and with a visibility of 2 miles (3.2 km). Augustin Fresnel invented a superior way of focusing light in the early 1850s and most lighthouses in the U.S. was converted to the Fresnel Lens, with Pemaquid Point receiving a fourth order Fresnel in 1856. The lens is one of only six Fresnel lenses still in service in Maine. The keeper's house was built in 1857.

Marcus A. Hanna, the only man ever awarded both the Medal of Honor (earned during the Civil War for bravery on July 4, 1863) and the Gold Lifesaving Medal (for rescuing life on January 28, 1885 at Cape Elizabeth), once served as keeper of the light. The station was automated in 1934.

By popular vote of Maine residents, the lighthouse was chosen to be featured in the Maine quarter, the 23rd in the 50 State Quarters Program issued by the U.S. Mint. Also depicted is a 3-masted schooner intended to resemble the Victory Chimes. Exposed bedrock descends from the lighthouse to the ocean creating a unique, scenic landscape. The geological history of these formations dates back hundreds of millions of years. These imposing structures have made this lighthouse with its setting one of the most photographed on the Maine coast.

The lighthouse is owned by the U.S. Coast Guard and is licensed to the American Lighthouse Foundation. Friends of Pemaquid Point Lighthouse (FPPL), one of the 21 chapters of the Foundation, operates the lighthouse. Upkeep and ongoing restoration are funded solely by visitor donations. FPPL member docents open the lighthouse for visits from mid-May to mid-October.

The lighthouse was added to the National Register of Historic Places as 'Pemaquid Point Light' on April 16, 1985, reference number 85000843.

On January 11, 2024, the lighthouse's bell house, which dates to the 19th century, was largely destroyed in a storm. The lighthouse and bell house were considered fully restored 8 months later.

== Pemaquid Point Lighthouse Park ==
The Bristol Parks and Recreation Department owns and operates the outbuildings surrounding the lighthouse as Pemaquid Point Lighthouse Park.

The keeper's house is now the Fishermen's Museum at Pemaquid, which contains displays and artifacts of the lighthouse and local maritime history. Opened in 2008, the Learning Center is a community resource for offering movies, classes and concerts.

Other activities in the park include viewing the lighthouse, picnicking, and viewing local paintings at the Pemaquid Art Gallery. A State Historic Site exists close by that features artifacts from Colonial Pemaquid, where a small colony of English settlers was formed in 1635 after their ship, the Angel Gabriel, was wrecked by the Great Colonial Hurricane of 1635.

== Geology ==
Silurian Period sediments laid down 430 million years ago were metamorphosed underground into a gneiss 360–415 million years ago, and intruded by molten rock which cooled slowly, creating the park's exposed metamorphic gray rocks with dikes of harder, white igneous rock. Underground heat and pressure tortured and folded the rock layers into the striking patterns that are now pounded and polished by the sea and rough weather.

== List of Light Keepers ==
(Keeper; Date appointed):

- Isaac Dunham: 3 November 1827
- Nathaniel Gammage, Jr.: 13 June 1837
- Robert Curtis: 31 July 1849
- Samuel C. Tibbetts: 9 April 1853
- John Fossett: 12 February 1858
- J. Lawler: 29 March 1861
- Marcus A. Hanna: 30 July 1869
- William L Sartell: 31 July 1873
- Charles A. Dolliver: 28 September 1883
- Clarence E. Marr: 16 August 1899
- Leroy S. Ewell: 1 July 1922

== Gallery ==
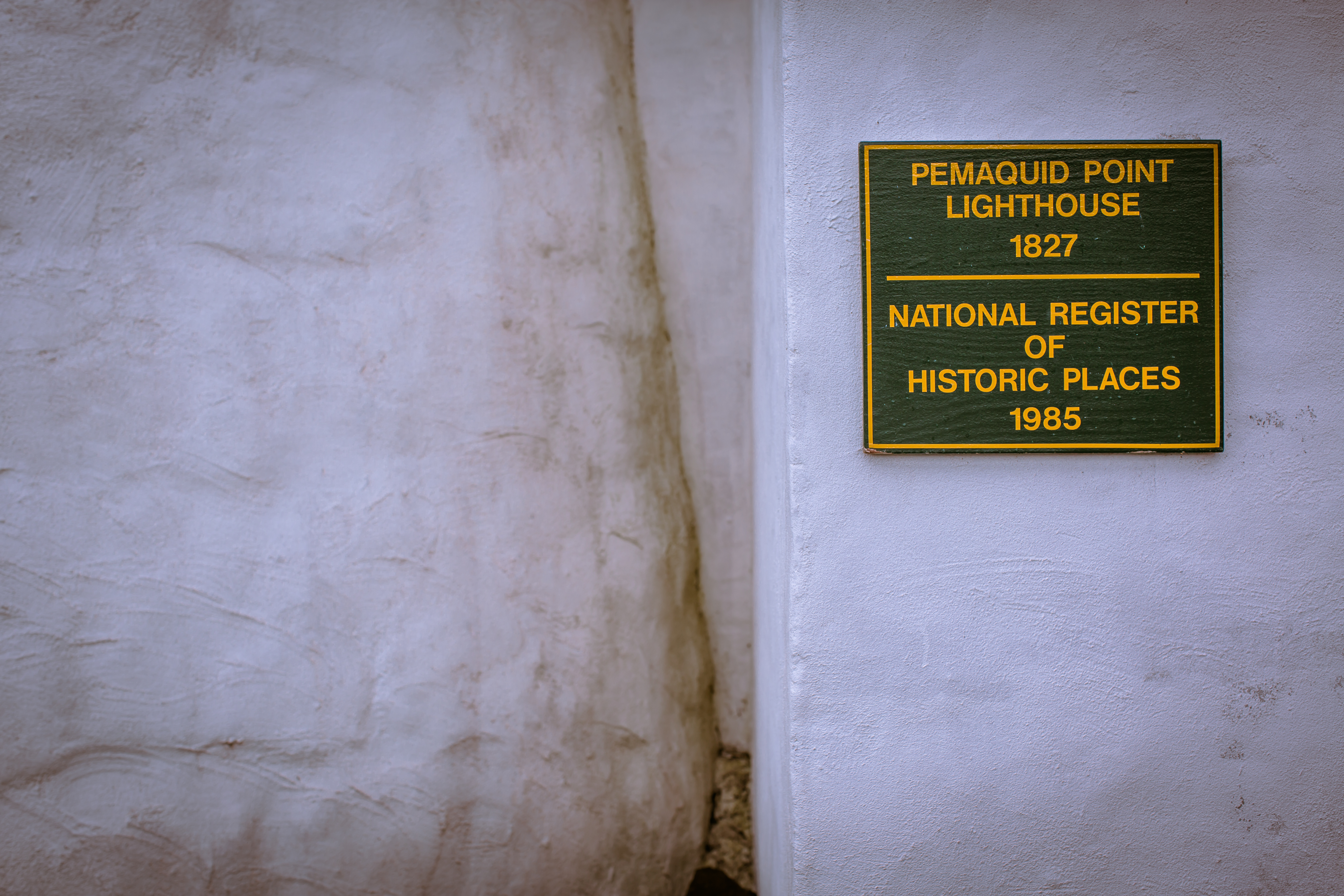
Pemaquid Point Light Station Sign, Bristol, Maine, USA 2012

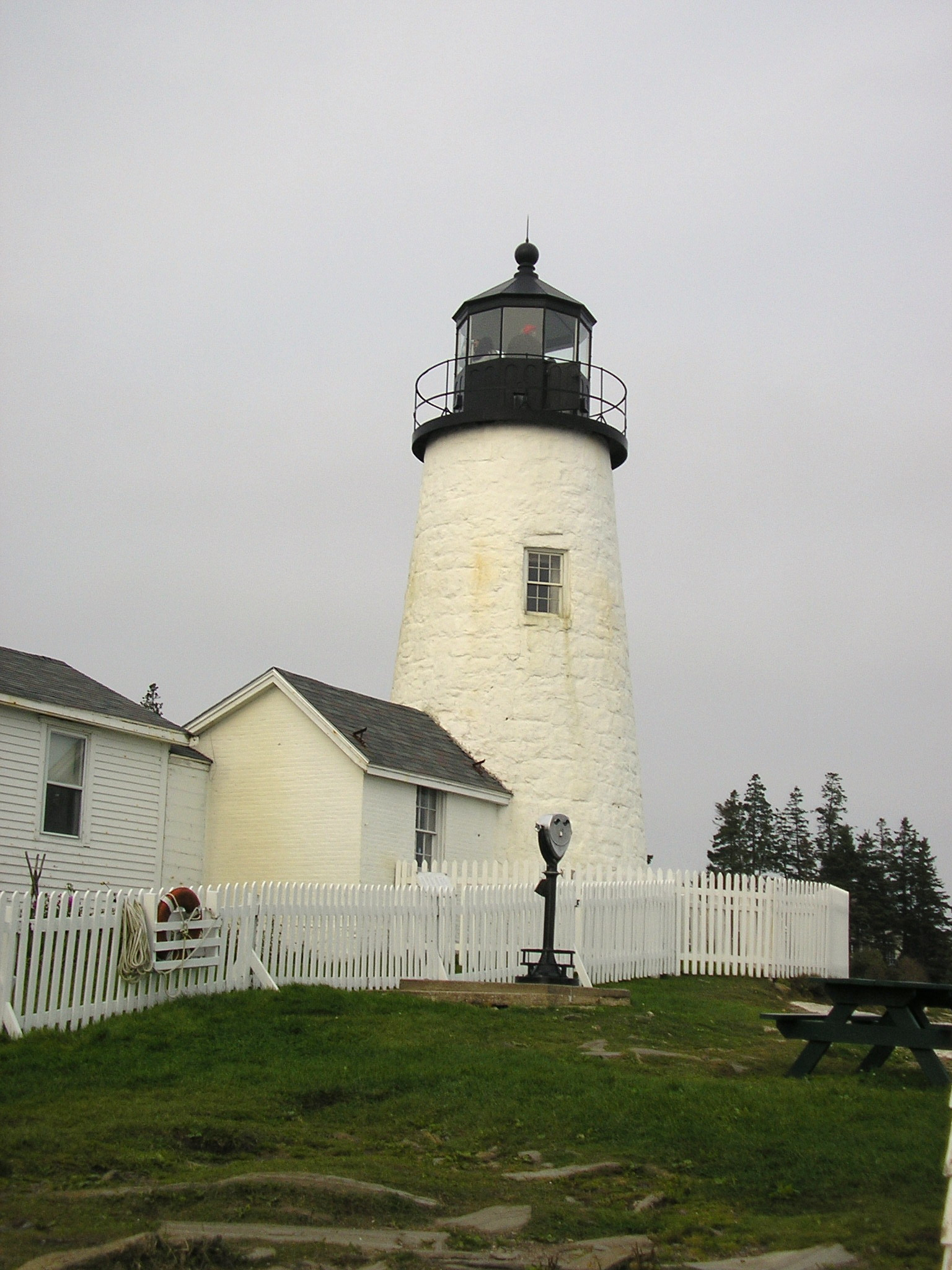
Pemaquid Point Lighthouse

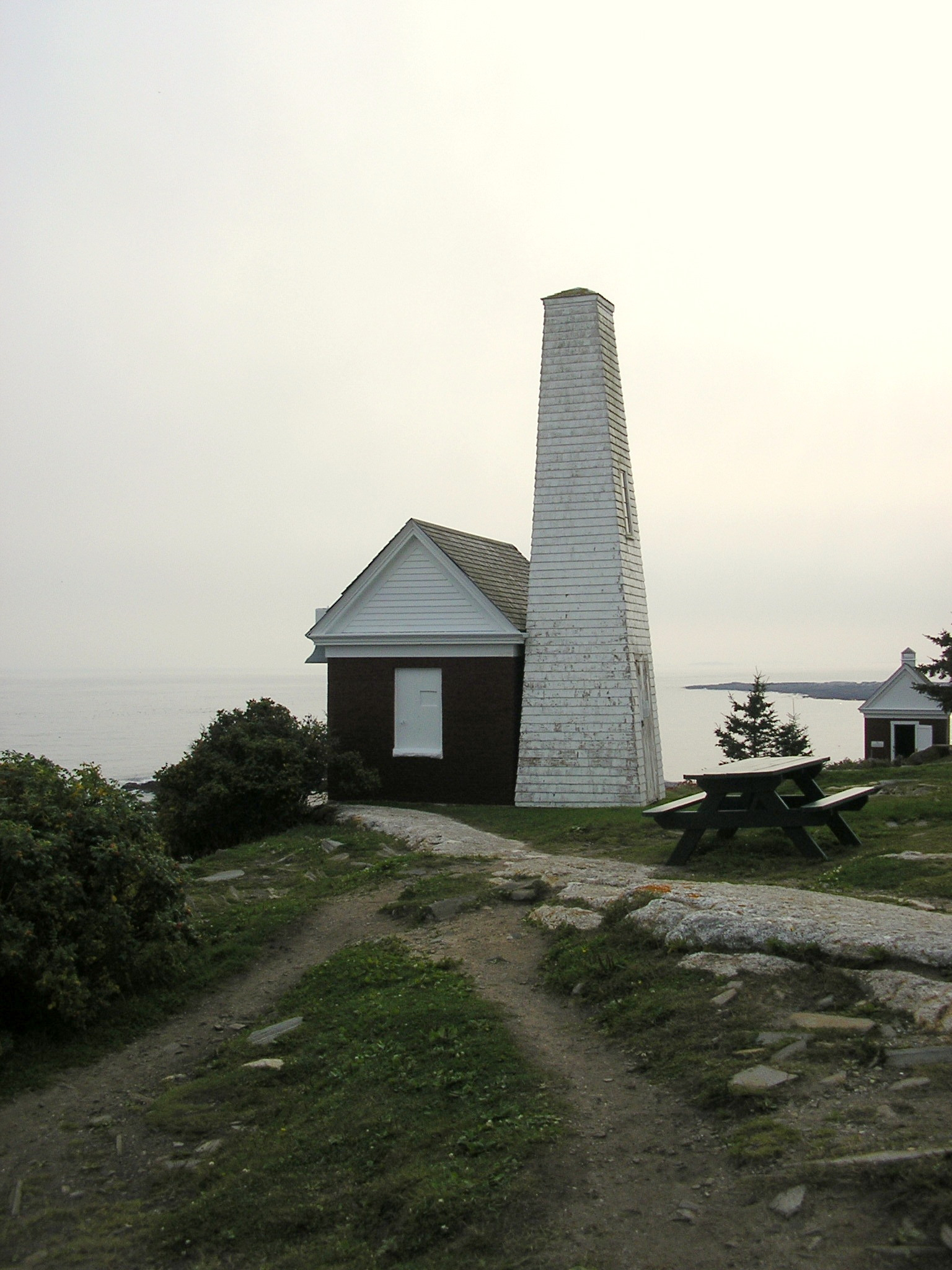
The bellhouse originally contained a bell and a weight-driven mechanism to ring it. The small tower contained the weight.

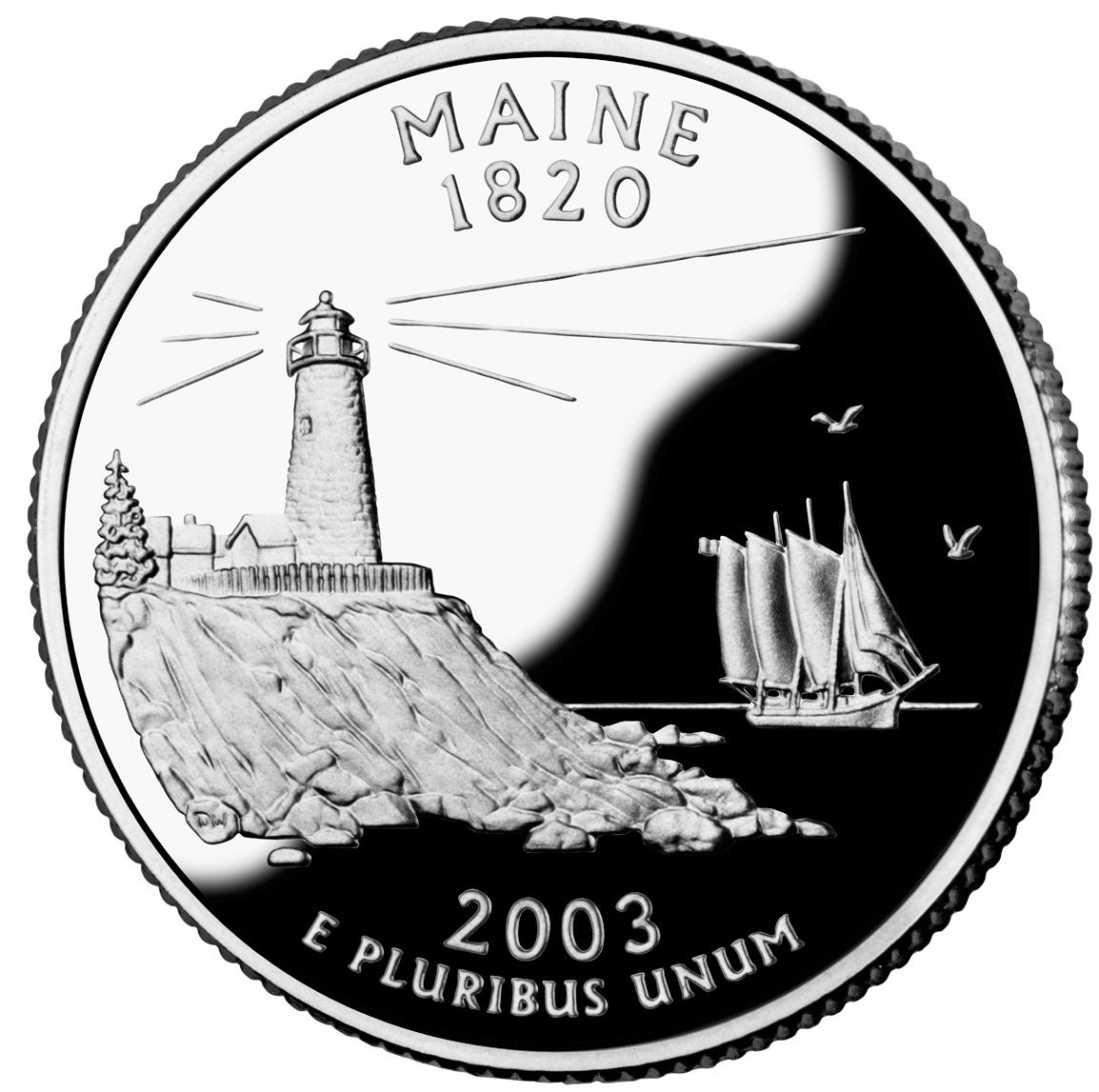
The Pemaquid Point Lighthouse as depicted on the Maine state quarter

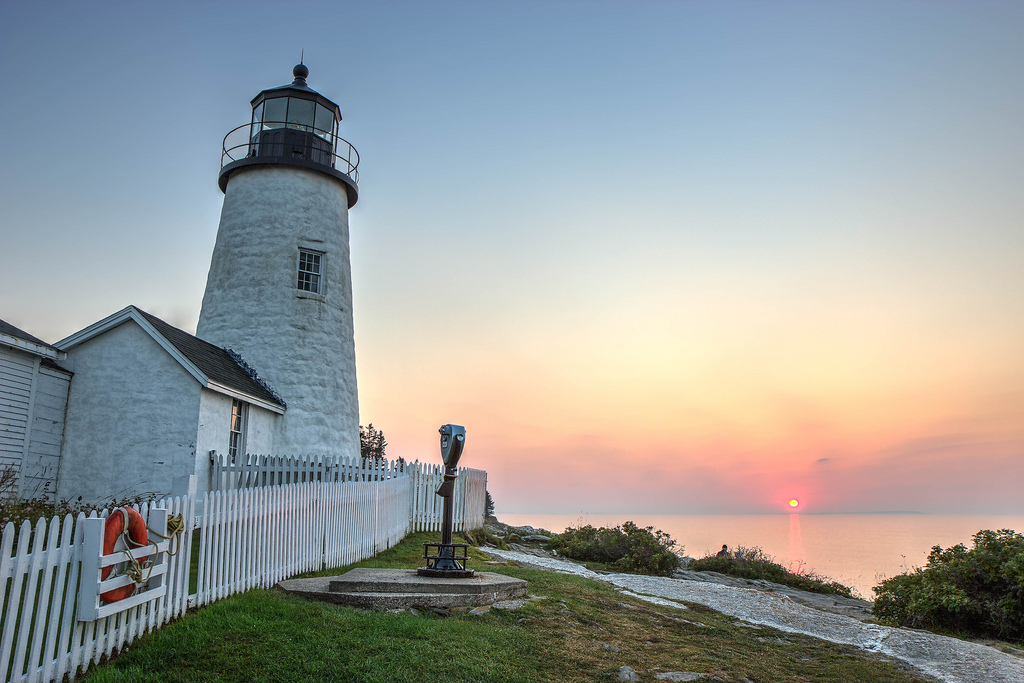
Pemaquid Point Lighthouse at sunrise

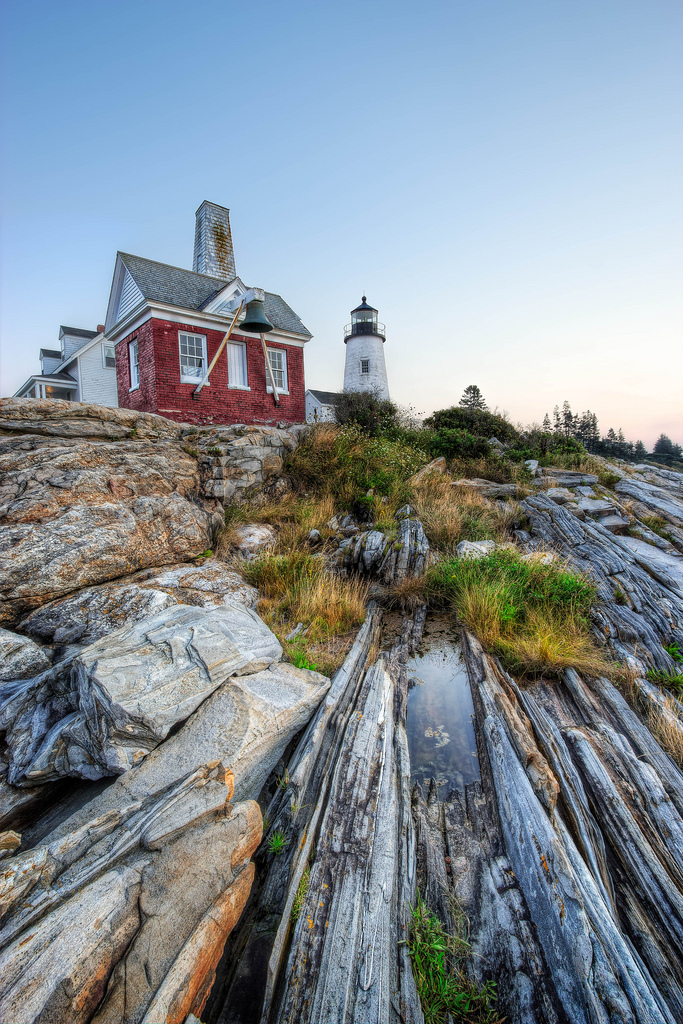
A view from the rocks of Pemaquid Point Lighthouse
