= Bertram K. and Nina Fletcher Little =

Bertram K. and Nina Fletcher Little were prominent collectors of American folk art and active historians.

The couple married in 1925 and in 1928 they purchased a home in Hudson, Massachusetts, for a weekend and summer retreat. Then in 1937 they purchased a 165-acre property in Essex, Massachusetts, carefully restoring the 1738 farmhouse, preserving original finishes while documenting their work. They named it Cogswell's Grant, after John Cogswell, the original 1636 land receipt. The couple collected and decorated their house with various "country arts" until 1984 when Mrs. Little transferred property ownership to the Society for the Preservation of New England Antiquities, reserving life tenancy rights for herself and her family. The property is now a historic house museum which is owned and operated by Historic New England. Collections of the couple over the years can be found at many museums, including the Maryland Center for History and Culture in Baltimore and the American Folk Art Museum in Manhattan. The couple received the inaugural Henry Francis du Pont Award from the Winterthur Museum, Garden and Library in 1984. They had three children: John B. Little, Warren M. Little, and Selina F. Little.

Bertram K. Little (1899–1993) served as director of the Society for the Preservation of New England Antiquities (now known as Historic New England) for 23 years.

Nina Fletcher Little (1903–1993) published six books including American Decorative Wall Painting: 1700–1850, and over 100 articles and exhibition catalogues. She was a primary consultant on the original 1957 conception of the Abby Aldrich Rockefeller Folk Art Museum in Colonial Williamsburg, the United States' first and the world's oldest continually-operated museum dedicated to the preservation, collection, and exhibition of American folk art. She is now recognized as one of the most important scholars in the field of American folk art.
