= Cogswell's Grant =

Historic house in Massachusetts, United States

Coordinates: 42.639042°N 70.773393°W

- U.S. National Register of Historic Places
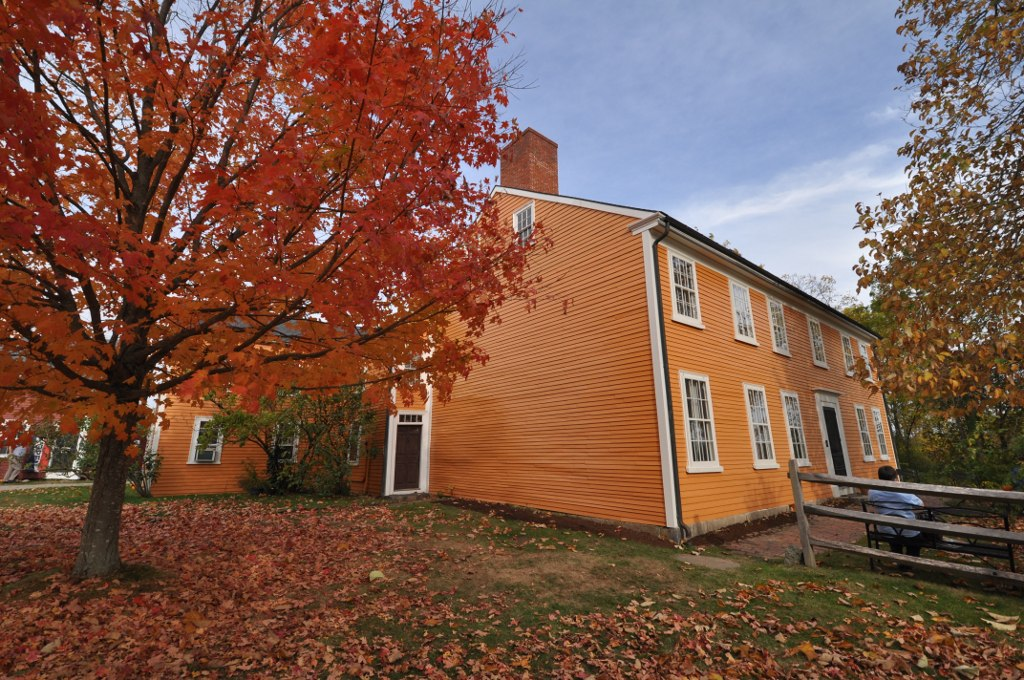
- Location: 60 Spring St
- Nearest city: Essex, Massachusetts
- NRHP reference No.: 90000666
- Added to NRHP: April 19, 1990

Cogswell's Grant is a working farm and historic house museum in Essex, Massachusetts. It was the summer home of Bertram K. and Nina Fletcher Little, preeminent collectors of American decorative arts in the mid 20th century. Through her research and innumerable publications, Mrs. Little charted new areas of American folk art (which she preferred to call "country arts"), such as decorative painting, floor coverings, boxes, and New England pottery.

In 1937, the Littles purchased this farm, including its 18th-century farmhouse with views of the Essex River, as a family retreat and place to entertain. They named it Cogswell's Grant, after John Cogswell, who was the first English colonial owner of the property, which includes about 165 acres (67 ha) of land. They carefully restored the farmhouse, trying to preserve original 18th-century finishes and carefully documenting their work, and decorated from their extensive collection of artifacts. In more than 50 years of collecting, they sought works of strong, even quirky character, and in particular favored objects with their original finishes and New England histories. They decorated the house for visual delight rather than historical accuracy. The result is rich in atmosphere and crowded with collections of things—primitive paintings, redware, painted furniture, stacked Shaker boxes, weather vanes and decoys—that have since come to define the country look.

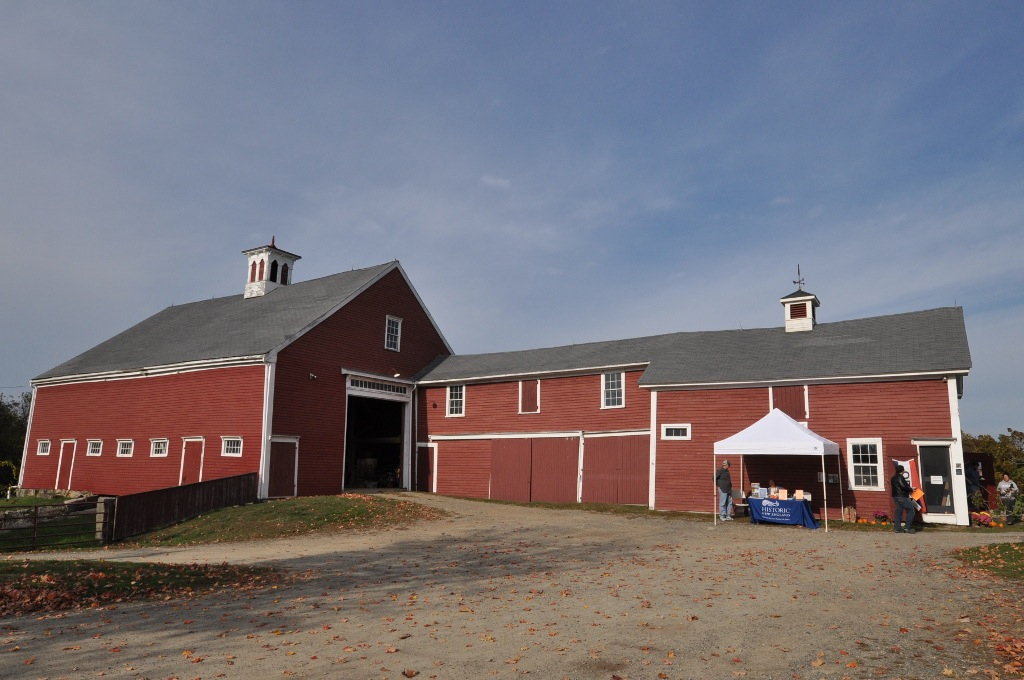
The 19th century barn; the rightmost portion is used for visitor facilities, while the balance is used for farm equipment and supplies.

Bertram Little served for many years as president of the Society for the Preservation of New England Antiquities, now called Historic New England. The Littles bequeathed the property, complete with its contents and associated records, to that organization in 1984. Part of the 19th century barn north of the house has been adapted for use as a visitor center, and the rear ell of the house has been adapted for use as a caretaker's residence and visitor restrooms.

Cogswell's Grant is open for public tours Wednesday through Sunday, June 1 - October 15.

== See also ==
- National Register of Historic Places listings in Essex County, Massachusetts
