= Angel Gabriel (ship) =

English passenger galleon

The Angel Gabriel was a 240-ton English passenger galleon. She was commissioned for Sir Walter Raleigh's last expedition to America in 1617. She sank in a storm off Pemaquid Point, near the newly established town of Bristol, Maine, on 15 August 1635. The sinking occurred during a hurricane in the middle of the Great Migration.

The ship was initially built as the Starre in 1615 and renamed the Jason by Sir Walter Raleigh for use in his second expedition to Guiana (then under control of the Spanish) in 1617. Following Raleigh's return it was seized and became a merchant ship, renamed the Angel Gabriel.

A stout ship designed and built to cope with combat, even as a merchant ship, the Angel Gabriel was involved in many further skirmishes between 1618 and 1635, including a notable engagement in 1627 off Cales where it was boarded several times but was able to clear its decks each time and eventually beat off three Spanish ships. This was possible because the defenders were able to retreat into the forecastle and sterncastle, which had reinforced bulkheads fitted with gunports for small cannon and shoulder weapons.

== 1635 voyage ==
From England to Massachusetts in a fleet of five ships, the Angel Gabriel joined the James, the Elizabeth (Bess), the Mary and the Diligence. As they approached New England, an unusually powerful early season hurricane struck, known as the "Great Colonial Hurricane of 1635", and the James and the Angel Gabriel were forced to ride it out just off the coast of modern-day Hampton, New Hampshire. According to the ship's log and the journal of Increase Mather, whose father Richard Mather and family were on the James, the following was recorded:

"And I must confess, I have peculiar reason to commemorate that solemn providence, inasmuch an my father and mother and four of my brethren wore then in a vessel upon the east of New-England, being at anchor amongst the rocks at the Isles of Shoals when the storm began; but their cables broke, and the ship was driving directly upon a mighty rock, so that all their lives were given up for lost; but then in an instant of time, God turned the wind about, which carried them from the rock of death before their eyes."

All one hundred-plus passengers aboard the James managed to make it to Boston Harbor two days later.

The Angel Gabriel was wrecked off the coast of Maine, but the smaller, faster ships, the Mary, the Bess, and the Diligence outran the storm, and landed in Newfoundland on 15 August 1635.

Several plaques commemorating the loss of the Angel Gabriel have been placed near Pemaquid. One reads:

Here at Pemaquid Harbor on 15 August 1635, the 250-ton galleon Angel Gabriel was wrecked in a fierce hurricane one day after her arrival from Bristol, England. Many of the vessel's immigrants to the new world had come ashore at the small Pemaquid settlement before the storm struck, but several crew members and passengers still aboard the ship perished. The surviving passengers eventually departed Pemaquid for towns in northeastern Massachusetts and southern New Hampshire.

This marker commemorating the historic voyage and loss of the Angel Gabriel was dedicated on 15 August 2010, the 375th anniversary of the wreck, by descendants of William Furber, a 21-year-old passenger who later settled in Dover, New Hampshire.

== Passengers on the last voyage ==
- Capt. Robert Andrews, Ship's Master, Ipswich, Massachusetts
- John Bailey Sr., weaver from Chippenham, England to Newbury, Massachusetts 1590–1651
- John Bailey Jr., 1612–1677
- Johanna Bailey (possibly came on a later ship)
- Henry Beck
- Deacon John Burnham
- Thomas Burnham
- Robert Burnham
- Ralph Blaisdell of Lancashire, settled in York, Maine
- Mrs. Elizabeth Blaisdell
- Henry Blaisdell
- William Furber, age 21, London, England, settled in Dover, New Hampshire
- John Cogswell & Elizabeth Cogswell and eight of their children, from Westbury Leigh, Wiltshire, England, settled in Ipswich, Massachusetts
- Samuel Haines, about age 24, apprentice to John Cogswell, settled in Greenland, New Hampshire
- William Hook
- Henry Simpson
- John Tuttle, about age 17, Devonshire, England, settled in Chebacco Parish and finally Dover, New Hampshire (known to locals as "Shipwreck John Tuttle")

Official records state that William Furber, Samuel Haines, and the Cogswells were aboard; the other passengers on the list are reported in family records, genealogies, and other secondary sources.
