= Mary Parker (Salem witch trials) =

American witch

- Born: Mary Ayer c. 1637
- Died: September 22, 1692; Salem Village, Province of Massachusetts Bay
- Cause of death: Execution by hanging
- Known for: Convicted of witchcraft in the Salem witch trials
- Relatives: Bush Family (distant ancestors)

Mary Parker (née Ayer) of Andover, Massachusetts Bay Colony, the daughter of John Ayer, was executed by hanging on September 22, 1692, with several others, for witchcraft in the Salem witch trials. She was a 55 year old widow. It is believed that Mary Parker’s family buried her body on their property, as was tradition for those who were executed. Mary's husband, Nathan, died in 1685. Nicholas Noyes officiated. Her daughter, Sarah Parker, was also accused. Historians have identified three others persons named Mary Parker who lived in colonial Massachusetts at the same time who are sometimes conflated with the woman who was executed. Her immediate family still lives in Massachusetts, and the most recent surnames traced back to her are French and Poland.
