= John Cogswell =

English-born manufacturer and landowner (1592–1669)

- Born: April 2, 1592; Westbury, Wiltshire, England
- Died: November 29, 1669 (aged 77); Ipswich, Massachusetts Bay Colony, English America
- Occupations: Manufacturer; landowner
- Spouse: Elizabeth Thompson (m. 1615)
- Children: 8

John Cogswell (April 2, 1592 – November 29, 1669) was a leading figure and large landowner in the early history of Ipswich, Massachusetts and a deputy for the General Court of Massachusetts. He is the immigrant ancestor to a large number of notable Americans as well as connected to the Aristocracy of Britain and the British Royal family as the 10th Great Grandfather to Diana, Princess of Wales.

== Biography ==
John Cogswell, born in Westbury Leigh, Wiltshire, England, was a successful merchant in London, England before migrating to the Massachusetts Bay Colony in 1635. He married Elizabeth, the daughter of Rev. William Thompson, vicar of Westbury in 1615. Twenty years later, in 1635, Cogswell and his family embarked on the Angel Gabriel, for Massachusetts. However, the ship was driven onto rocks on the coast of Maine during the Great Colonial Hurricane of 1635. Cogswell salvaged most of what he lost from the wreck and headed south for Boston before settling in Ipswich.

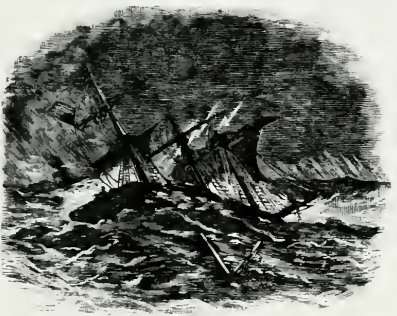
Cogswell's Angel Gabriel Wreck

In Ipswich, Cogswell was granted 300 acres of land (now known as Cogswell's Grant) and he received freeman status to allow him to run for public office. He eventually became a deputy to the General Court for Ipswich, in addition to fulfilling functions for the town. Cogswell died in 1669. He was honored with a five-mile long funeral procession followed by a service conducted by Rev. William Hubbard. The historian Darrett B. Rutman states that Cogswell's will is "exceptional in providing for the formal education of a daughter." Although he was a man of reputation in his time, his greatest legacy for posterity is surviving the great hurricane and leaving many celebrated descendants.

== Descendants ==
John Cogswell and Elizabeth Thompson had many children; however, the following children left notable descendants:

William Cogswell (1619–1696). He married Susannah Hawkes. He and his son, Jonathan, signed a petition to protect John Proctor and his wife Elizabeth during the Salem witch trials. An influential citizen of Ipswich, he acquired the Rev. John Wise to be the first pastor of Chebacco Parish.

John Cogswell Jr (1622–1653). He died of a snake bite on a return voyage from London, a year after the death of his wife, Elizabeth Thoth (of England). He left behind three children, John, Samuel and Elizabeth Cogswell – the youngest but a year old.

Hannah Cogswell (1626–1704). She married Deacon Cornelius Waldo.

Abigail Cogswell (1641–1728). She married Thomas Clarke.

Sarah Cogswell (1645–1692). She married Simon Tuttle.
