= John Evered =

English-born American settler

Captain John Evered
- Born: John Evered Webb c. 1611; Wiltshire, England
- Died: August 17, 1668 (aged 56–57); Atlantic Ocean

Captain John Evered (ca.1611–1668), also known as Webb, was one of the first Europeans to settle what is now known as the Merrimack Valley in Massachusetts, specifically the town of Dracut, which Evered named.

== Early years ==
John was born in Wiltshire, England around 1611, to father John Webb (b.1580) and mother Rebecca Evered. He was baptised in 1612 in Bromham, Wiltshire.

In his early 20s, he, his brother Stephen, their oldest sister Hannah and her husband John Ayer (Eyre) and children, on June 3, 1635, set sail for the New World, aboard the ship James. As they approached New England, a hurricane struck, and they were forced to ride it out just off the coast of modern-day Hampton, New Hampshire. According to the ship's log and the journal of Increase Mather, son of some of the passengers, the following was recorded;

"At this moment,... their lives were given up for lost; but then, in an instant of time, God turned the wind about, which carried them from the rocks of death before their eyes. ...her sails rent in sunder, and split in pieces, as if they had been rotten ragges..."

They tried to stand down during the storm just outside the Isles of Shoals, but lost all three anchors, as no canvas or rope would hold, but on Aug 13, 1635, torn to pieces, and not one death, all one hundred plus passengers of the James managed to make it to Boston Harbor. The ship's log listed John and his brother as laborers/husbandmen. John and Stephen stayed in Boston, while his brother-in-law went on to Salisbury, Massachusetts before finally settling in Haverhill.

== Life in Boston ==
As a single man, John was admitted to the First Church, Boston, and became a mariner, and he was made a freeman of the Massachusetts Bay province on December 7, 1636.

In 1639, while living in Boston, he married Mary Faireweather, a widow of Thomas Fayreweather, as she states her intentions in a deed of gift to her son John;

"…to the use of such child and children that shall be lawfully begotten betweene me and John Everet als. Webb whome I intend by the grace of God to take to my husband…”

They bought their first home together in Boston for 50 pounds, and Mary and John had a daughter, Hannah Webb Evered, the following year. This was their only child together, making a family of four, with stepson John, only six years of age when Hannah was born, from Mary's deceased husband.

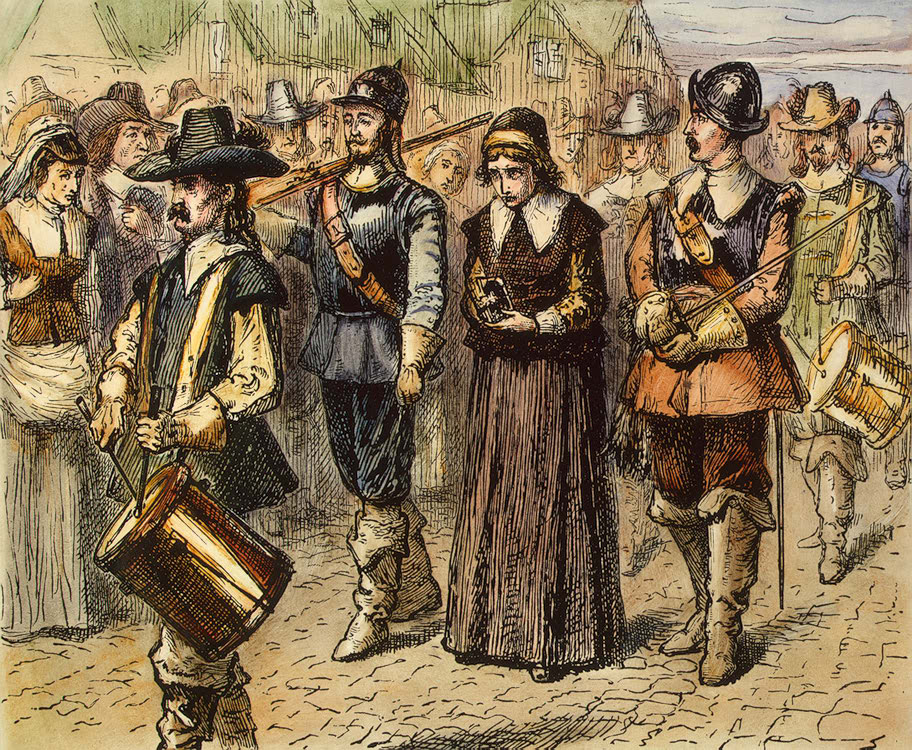
"Mary Dyer led to execution on Boston Common, 1 June 1660", by an unknown 19th century artist

In 1641, John Evered obtained a commission to conduct fishing operations at the Isle of Sables:

“A Commission to John Webb als ___ of Boston and his company to trade & doe their business at the Isle of Sables & to pass in the barke Endeavor of Salem wherof is Master Joseph Grafton."

In 1643, Evered was made a member of the Ancient and Honorable Artillery Company of Massachusetts, with the rank of Ensign, for which he received 10 pounds for his first year of service. In 1655 he was made first sergeant, then later Captain.

As Captain, his most notable duty was the hanging of Mary Dyer in 1660. Captain Evered is quoted as telling her that she had previously been found guilty of the same charge (being a Quaker) and been banished, that she now had one last chance to repent and be banished again, to which she replied that she would not. He then told her she was condemned to death for violating the law, and then she was hanged.

He and his family moved from their tiny Boston home to 90 acres (36 ha) in Braintree on the "Montaquid" (Monatiquot River), until he sold it on February 19, 1648 to Samuel Allen.

== Land settlings ==
On June 7, 1659, John Evered (Webb) was granted land by the General Court to military officers a farm in Chelmsford, and he also bought a neighboring island, which is most likely modern-day downtown Lowell. Webb was the first settler upon the north side of the Merrimack River, and the man in whose honor the town of Dracut was named. Webb sold a portion of his Boston estate in 1661, probably about the time he officially moved to Chelmsford. The town of Chelmsford also granted several more parcels of land to Mr. John Webb, on November 9, 1661.

In October 1665, Captain John Evered bought from Bess, wife of Nobb How and daughter of Passaconaway, the land called Augumtoocooke, what is now Dracut, for the sum of four yards of Duffill and one pound of tobacco. Webb then sold tracts of the land to Richard Shatswell and Samuel Varnum. Before owning it himself, Webb had already sold 11,000 acres (4,500 ha) of the land months earlier to Samuel Varnum, as the deed for "Drawcutt upon Mirrimack" was dated 1664, for 400£ (four hundred pounds). Richard Shatswell then took his Dracut land and exchanged it with Edward Coburn for his home and land in Ipswich.

As so recorded to the Computation of the Church of England, on September 13, 1668, a few weeks after Evered's death, his wife Mary sold the 1,600-acre (650 ha) family farm in Dracut to Edward Coburn of Ipswich for 1,300£. The land stretched from Samuel Varnum's property to Richard Shatwell's on the east to the Merrimack River.

== Later years ==
John's brother Stephen Webb died in Boston on September 18, 1659, a servant to Lieut. William Philps.

John, in his own will dated February 10, 1665, left to his nephews, and his own daughter:

... John Eyers, Robert Eyers, Thomas Eyers, Peter Eyers, Nathaniel Eyers of Haverhill and the wife of John Arsley of Andevour, and if there be any more brothers and sisters of that family the Eayres as is before mentioned although not named herein, yet the same to have equal portion with them as if they were herein nominated.

In his will he referred to himself as of Haverhill, where his daughter Hannah resided with her husband James.

== Death ==
Captain John Evered died in a whaling accident on August 17, 1668. A whale pulled him overboard and he drowned.

17th 8m 68. John Web, alias, Everit, pursuing a Whale, was caught in ye rope, twisted about his middle, & being drawn into ye sea, was drowned.

— Roxbury, MA Church records
