= John Ayer =

English settler to Massachusetts (1582–1657)

- Born: September 2, 1582; Salisbury, Wiltshire, England
- Died: March 31, 1657 (aged 74); Haverhill, Massachusetts Bay Colony, English America
- Occupations: Farmer; town selectman
- Known for: Founding settler of Haverhill, Massachusetts
- Spouse: Hannah Evered Webb
- Children: 9

John Ayer (September 2, 1582 – March 31, 1657) was an English-born farmer and town selectman who one of the original European settlers to Massachusetts, settling in Ipswich, Haverhill, and Salisbury.

== Early years ==
Coat of Arms of John Ayer

John was born on September 2, 1582, to father Thomas Eyre (Ayer) and Elizabeth Rogers, in Salisbury, Wiltshire, England. He married once prior to 1619, but it is unclear what happened to Rogers.

Ayer married Hannah Evered Webb.

On June 3, 1635, John Ayer set sail for the New World with his family, including his two brothers-in-law, John and Stephen, aboard the ship James. As they approached New England, a hurricane struck, and they were forced to ride it out just off the coast of modern-day Hampton, New Hampshire. According to the ship's log and the journal of Increase Mather, whose father Richard Mather and family were passengers, the following was recorded;

"At this moment,... their lives were given up for lost; but then, in an instant of time, God turned the wind about, which carried them from the rocks of death before their eyes. ...her sails rent in sunder, and split in pieces, as if they had been rotten ragges..."

They tried to stand down during the storm just outside the Isles of Shoals, but lost all three anchors, as no canvas or rope would hold, but on Aug 13, 1635, torn to pieces, and not one death, all one hundred plus passengers of the James managed to make it to Boston Harbor.

== New World settlements ==
It is reported that John and Hannah first moved to Ipswich before being part of the new settlement of the "plantation at Merrimack" on September 6, 1638. A year later the plantation was named "Colchester", then finally Salisbury in 1640. The idea was to establish a plantation-style settlement with the following criteria, as reported to the General Court in March 1638:

"At a meeting at merrimack of Mr Simone Bradstreet, Mr Samuell Dudly, Mr Danniell Dennisonn, Christopher Batt, Samuell Winsley, John Sanders:

"It was ordered that there shall be 2 divisions of Meadow, the one nerrer, the other farther, the nerrest shall haue fower Acres to Each 100h(£), the other left to farther Consideration. "It was further ordered that vpland for planting lotts shall be divided so as he that hath vnder 50h shall haue 4 Acres, and he that hath aboue 50h to 150h shall haue 6 Acres, and all aboue shall haue 4 Acres to Euerie 100h.

"Allso, it was ordered that all lotts granted to singlemen are on Condition that they shall inhabit here before the 6 of may next, and such as haue families that they shall inhabitt here before the last of october next."

"The names of those yt have lotts & proportions granted pr the Toune of Colchester in the first division;

Mr. Sam: Dudley, Mr. Willj Hooke, Mr Willj Worcester, Mr. Christopher Batt, Mr Sam: Winsley, Mr. Henry Biley, John Sanders, Mr Francis Doue, Jno Rolfe, Mr. Tho: Dummer, Mr Henry Monday, George Carr, Mr Tho. Bradbury, Jno Harrison, Mr John Hodges, Abra: Morrell, Jno Fullar, Phili.Challis, Luke Heard, Josiah Cobbet, Jarret Haddon, Anthony Colby, John Bayly Sen, John Stephens, John Seuerans, Robert Pike, Robt Ring, Richard Singleterry, Tho Macy, Tho. Hauxwell, Jno Clifford, John Eyres, Roger Eastman, Anthony Sadler, Fittz, Rowell, Widdow Browne. "This is A true copie of the originall list taken out of the old book of Reccords for Salisbury as Attests.2 "Vera copia Atest THO. BRADBURY rec.

EDWARD RAWSON Secrety"

In the year's end report, dated December 25, 1650, it states that "John Ayres Sen:" was assigned land grant No. 52 of the original 71 plots of the plantations, but by this time was reporting no crops.

Around 1646, Ayer and his family moved one settlement over, to the newly formed Puritan settlement of Haverhill. Haverhill, originally called Pentucket by the native Indians, was granted by the General Court on May 13, 1640, but not made official until the representatives of Passaconaway signed the purchase agreement on November 15, 1642, for 3 pounds, 10 shillings.

== Later years ==
After moving to Haverhill, John & Hannah had three more surviving children. Their issue is as follows:

- John Ayer
- Robert Ayer, b. England (1625-)
- Rebecca Ayer
- Thomas Ayer (-1686)
- Peter Cornet Ayer, b. England (1633-1699)
- Mary Ayer (1634-1692)
- Obadiah Ayer
- Hannah Ayer, b. Haverhill (1644 - 1676)
- Nathaniel Ayer
