= Great Colonial Hurricane of 1635 =

Category 4 Atlantic hurricane in 1635

Great Colonial hurricane
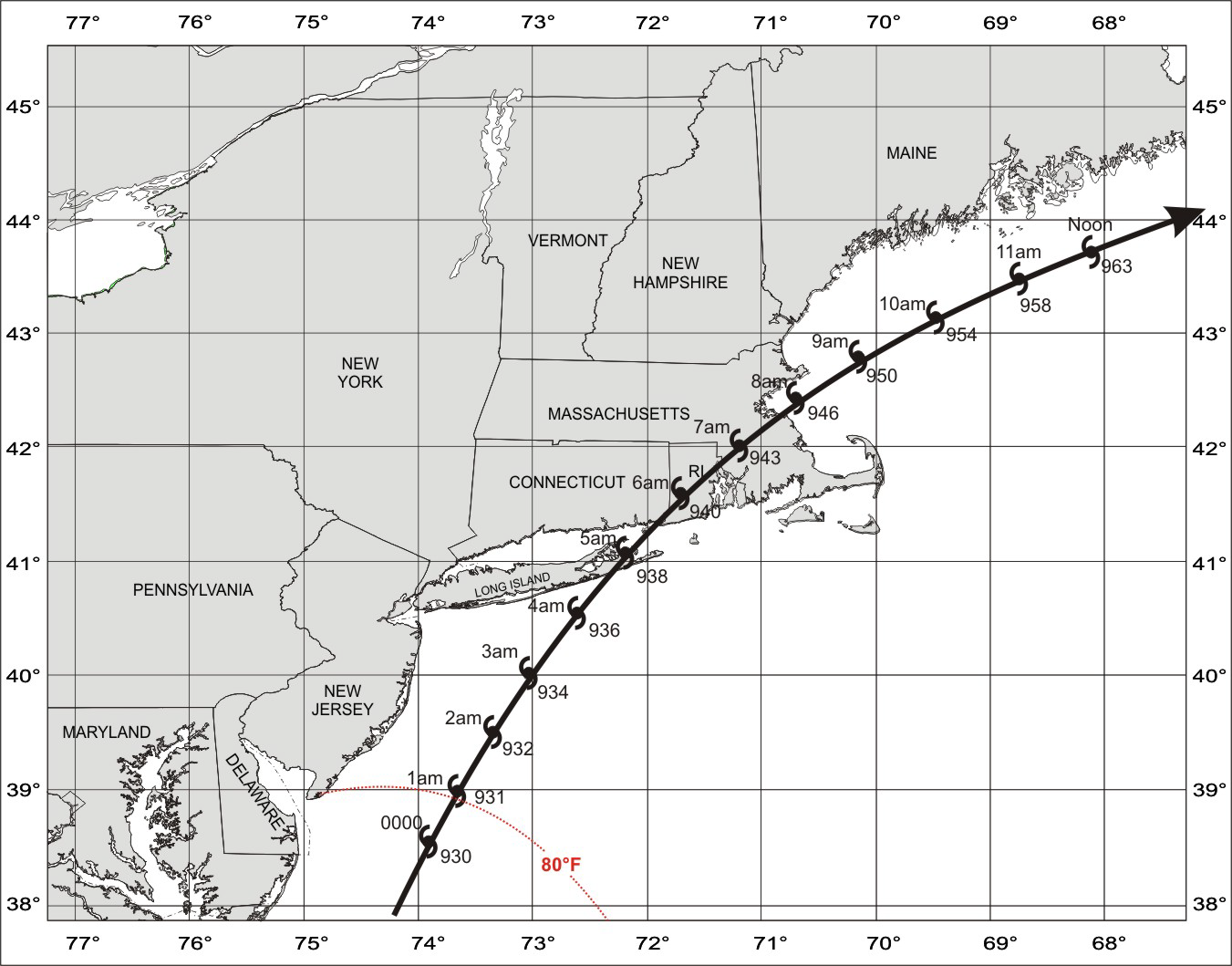
- Map of the Great Colonial Hurricane's path (reconstructed by the AOML)

Meteorological history
- Formed: Unknown
- Dissipated: August 25, 1635

Category 4 major hurricane
- 1-minute sustained (SSHWS/NWS)
- Highest winds: ≥135 mph (≥215 km/h)
- Lowest pressure: ≤930 mbar (hPa); ≤27.46 inHg (estimated)

Overall effects
- Fatalities: 46+ direct
- Injuries: Unknown
- Damage: Unknown
- Areas affected: Virginia, Long Island, New England, other areas? (Information scarce)
- Part of the 1635 Atlantic hurricane season

The Great Colonial Hurricane of 1635 was an extraordinarily powerful and devastating Atlantic hurricane that brushed Colonial Virginia and struck the New England Colonies in late August 1635. Accounts of the storm are very limited, but it was likely the most intense hurricane to hit New England since European colonization. The storm had a similar track and forward speed to that of the 1944 Great Atlantic hurricane and is the first of five known major hurricanes to have struck the modern New England region. The storm also likely produced one of the greatest storm surges in United States history, modern analysis has found.

== Meteorological history ==
The first recorded mention of the Great Colonial Hurricane was on August 24, 1635, at the Virginia Colony at Jamestown. It affected Jamestown as a major hurricane, although no references can be found to damage. This is likely because the hurricane evidently moved past rapidly, well east of the settlement. The pressure at this time is estimated to have been below 930 mbar (27.46 inHg). This would make it the most intense tropical cyclone in the world north of modern-day South Carolina.

The storm then continued at ~40 mph (65 km/h) before making landfall in eastern Long Island during the early morning of August 26, 1635, with sustained winds of at least 125 mph (200 km/h). The storm then struck modern-day Connecticut and Rhode Island shortly after, with a pressure of 939 mbar (27.7 inHg). Governors John Winthrop of Massachusetts Bay Colony and William Bradford of Plymouth Colony recorded accounts of the hurricane. Both describe high winds, 14 to 20 feet (4.3 to 6.1 m) storm surges along the south-facing coasts and great destruction. The storm then continued before striking the Port of Boston with a pressure of ~945 mbar (27.9 inHg). After continuing into the Gulf of Maine, details on the storm remain unknown.

== Effects ==
Much of the area between Providence and the Piscataqua River was destroyed. Locals noted the catastrophic damage to the environment, crops and structures. Some damage was still noticeable over fifty years later. Bradford also wrote that the storm drowned seventeen Indians, flattened many houses and toppled or destroyed thousands of trees.

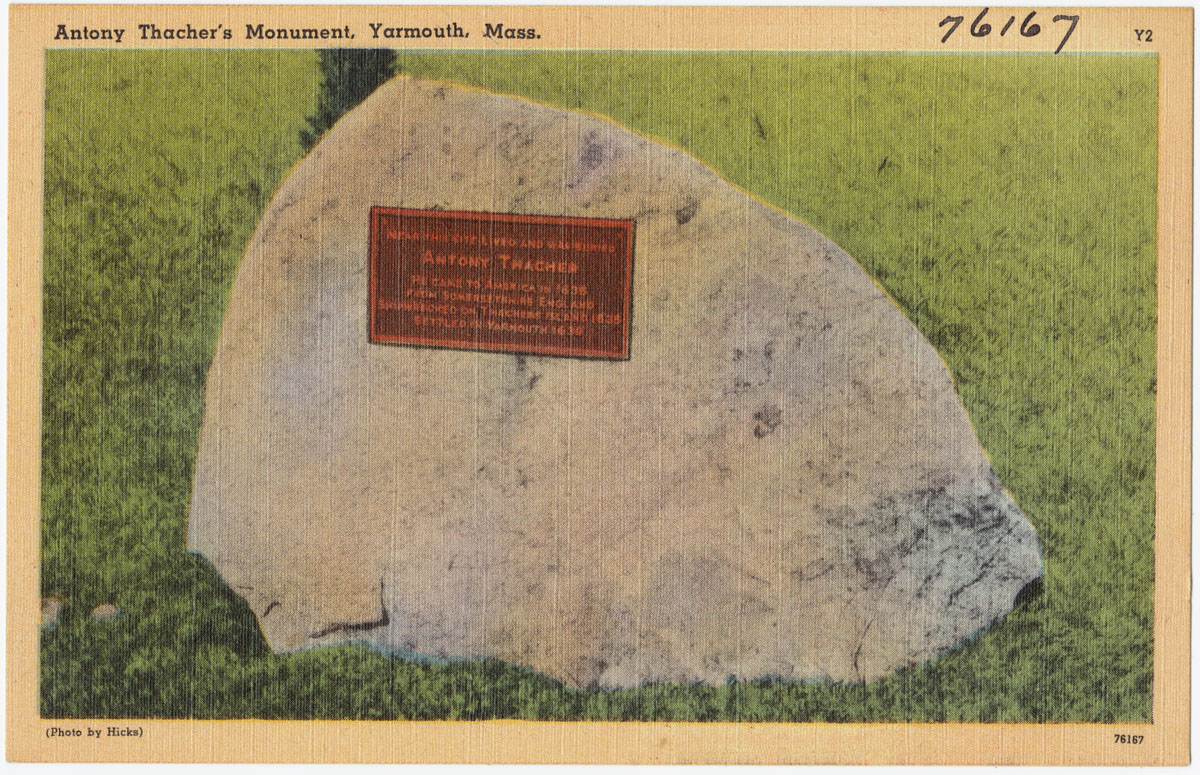
Postcard showing Antony Thacher's Monument

The small barque Watch and Wait, owned by a Mr. Isaac Allerton, foundered in the storm off Cape Ann with twenty-three people aboard. The only survivors were Antony Thacher and his wife, who reached Thacher Island. Thacher wrote an account of the shipwreck, while John Greenleaf Whittier based his poem "The Swan Song of Parson Avery" on Thacher's account of Father Joseph Avery's death during the wreck.

In Narragansett Bay, the tide was 14 feet (4.3 m) above the ordinary tide and drowned eight Indians fleeing from their wigwams. The highest totals were at the head of Buzzards Bay, where a surge of 18 to 24 feet (5.5 to 7.3 m) occurred. The town of Plymouth suffered severe damage when the town's houses blew down. The wind also blew down mile-long swathes of woods in Plymouth, and elsewhere in eastern Massachusetts. It also destroyed Plymouth Colony's Aptucxet Trading Post in Bourne. The worst of the damage in the greater Boston area occurred to the south. According to the accounts of Bradford and Winthrop, high surge swept over the low-lying tracts of Dorchester, ruining the farms and landscape.

The ships James and Angel Gabriel had just anchored off the New England coast, full of settlers from England, and they were caught in the storm. James survived, but Angel Gabriel was wrecked at Pemaquid, Massachusetts Bay Colony (now Bristol, Maine). An account from The Cogswells in America states: "'The storm was frightful at Pemaquid, the wind blowing from the northeast, the tide rising to a very unusual height, in some places more than twenty feet right up and down; this was succeeded by another and unaccountable tidal wave still higher.' The Angel Gabriel became a total wreck, passengers, cattle, and goods were all cast upon the angry waves. Three or four passengers and one seaman perished, and there was the loss of cattle and much property."

== Modern analysis ==
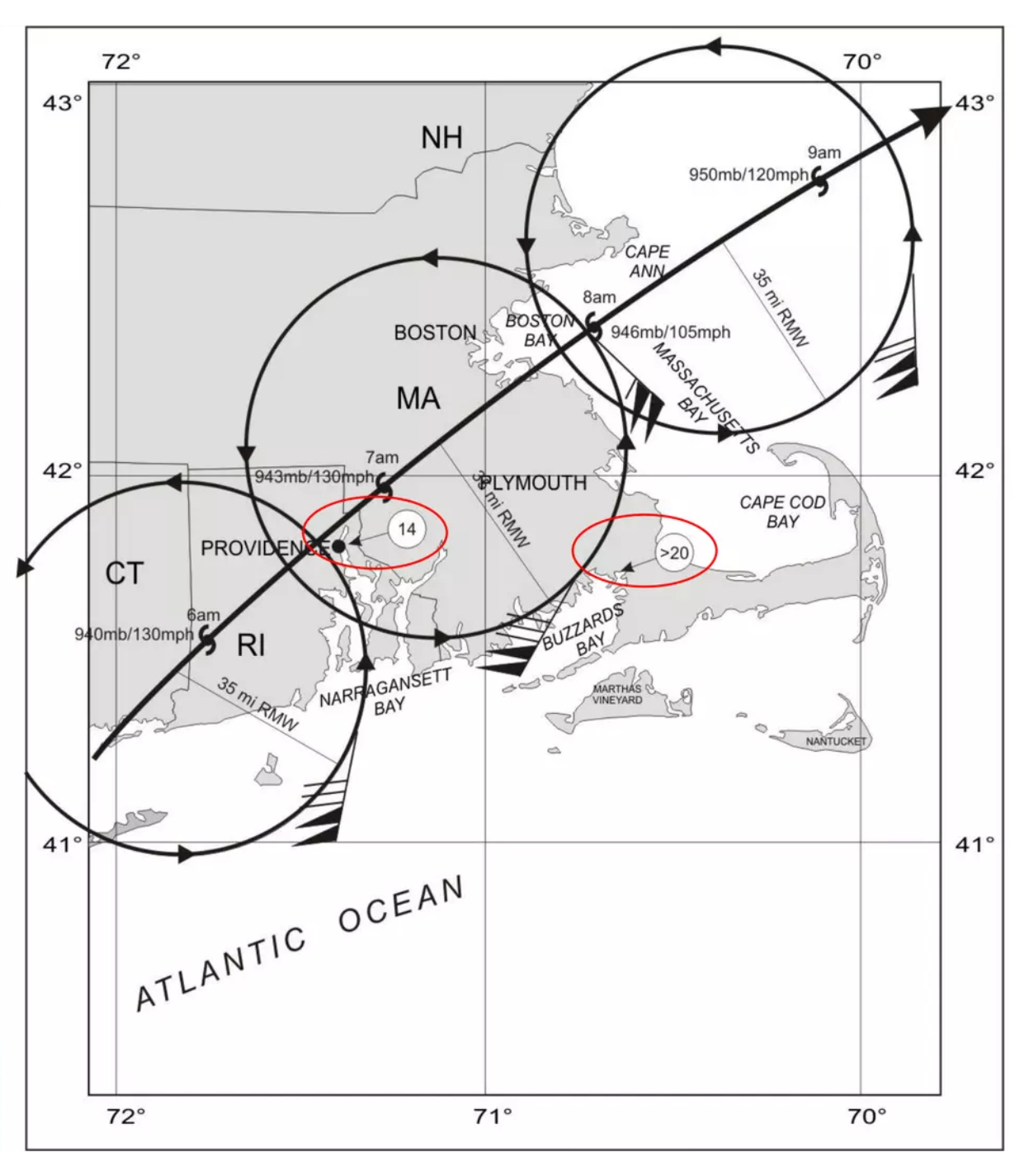
Track of the hurricane from a simulation, showcasing a storm surge of over 20 feet in the Buzzards Bay.

The Hurricane Research Division of the Atlantic Oceanographic and Meteorological Laboratory of NOAA has conducted a re-analysis project to re-examine the National Hurricane Center's data about historic hurricanes. Brian Jarvinen used modern hurricane and storm surge computer models to recreate a storm consistent with contemporaneous accounts of the Great Colonial Hurricane. He estimated that the storm was probably a Cape Verde-type hurricane, considering its intensity; and likely took a similar track to that of the Great Atlantic Hurricane of 1944 and Hurricane Edna of 1954. The storm's eye would have struck Long Island before moving between Boston and Plymouth. The storm likely would have been a large Category 4 or 5 hurricane when passing by Virginia and was at least a high-end Category 3 at landfall. Sustained winds of 132 mph (212 km/h) and a central pressure of 938 mbar (27.7 inHg) is the estimated intensity during the Long Island's landfall, and a pressure of 939 mbar (27.7 inHg) during the second landfall. If accurate, this would make it the most intense hurricane to make landfall north of Cape Fear, North Carolina. Jarvinen also noted that the hurricane may have produced the highest storm surge along the East Coast in recorded history, at great than 20 feet (6.1 m) in the Narragansett Bay.

An erosional scarp in the western Gulf of Maine may be a trace of the Great Colonial Hurricane.

== See also ==
- List of Atlantic hurricanes
- List of New England hurricanes
- Angel Gabriel (ship)
- The Elusive English Galleon
