= Boston Female Asylum =

Orphanage in Massachusetts, USA

Coordinates: 42°20′45.15″N 71°3′53.23″W

The Boston Female Asylum (1803–1910) was an orphanage in Boston, Massachusetts, US "for the care of indigent girls." Its mission was to "receive ... protect ... and instruct ... female orphans until the age of 10 years, when they are placed in respectable families."

== History ==
The Asylum incorporated in 1803. Hannah Stillman served as its first director. At the time, "the only public charities then existing in our good town of Boston, except the Almshouse, were the Boston Marine Society, ... the Boston Humane Society, ... and the Boston Dispensary. As late as 1886, some found notable that "the asylum is under the direction of a board of lady managers."

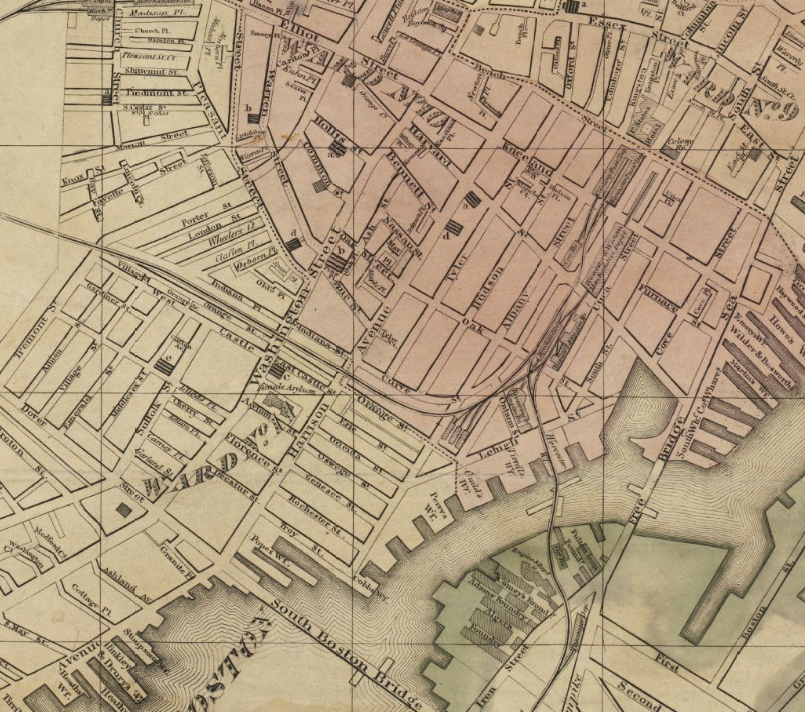
Detail of 1846 map of Boston, showing Female Asylum on Washington St. in the South End; map engraved by G.G. Smith

Early supporters included Robert Treat Paine Jr. Annual fundraising events raised substantial sums. For instance, the 1803 fundraiser at Trinity Church included a sermon by Samuel Parker, "an ode written for the occasion, ... [and] the Franklin Musical Society [which] performed the musical part, to great satisfaction." After the event, local newspaper publishers Gilbert & Dean wrote: "we have not learnt what collections the society made, but it must have been above five hundred dollars."

In 1807 the orphanage was located on South Street; in 1823 on Essex Street; and from the ca.1840s on Washington Street. By 1873, "between 70 and 80 children are provided for in the Asylum. ... Annual expenses, which are between $11,000 and $12,000, are defrayed mostly by income from permanent funds, and to small extent by annual subscriptions."

"Beginning in 1902, the managers of the asylum came to feel strongly ... in favor of the use of the family home for the care of children, in preference to the institution. Gradually their work took on new form, until, in 1907, the asylum was finally closed, and family home care was entirely substituted."

In 1910 the organization changed its name to the Boston Society for the Care of Girls. Some years later, it "merged with the Boston Children's Aid Society in 1923 to form the Children's Aid Association." Then in 1980, the Children's Aid Association "merged with the Boston Children’s Friend Society, an adoption agency formed in 1883, and Boston Children’s Services (BCS) was born." In the 2000s Boston Children’s Services, New England Home for Little Wanderers, Parents’ and Children’s Services, and Charles River Health Management merged into The Home for Little Wanderers, which provides a variety of services in Massachusetts.

== Locations in Boston ==
- South Street (ca.1807)
- 62 Essex St. (ca.1823)
- Washington St., corner Asylum St. (ca.1844-1857); 750 Washington St. (ca.1873); 1008 Washington St. (ca.1904)

== Variant names ==
- Asylum for Female Orphans
- Boston Female Asylum for Orphans
- Boston Female Society for Destitute Orphans
- Female Orphan Asylum

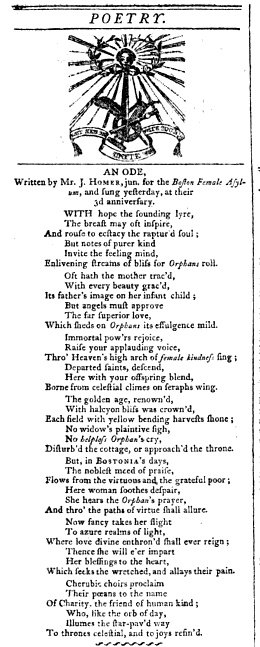
Ode by J.Homer, sung at the 3rd anniversary of the Boston Female Asylum, held at Trinity Church, 1803 (Boston Weekly Magazine)
