= Abel Bowen =

American engraver (1790–1850)

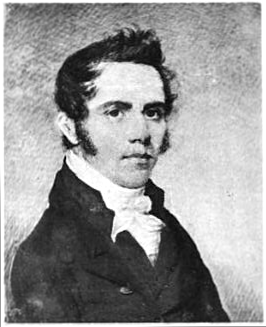
Portrait of Bowen

Abel Bowen (December 23, 1790 – March 11, 1850) was an American engraver, publisher, and author who was based in Boston during the early 19th century.

== Life ==
Bowen was born in Sand Lake, New York on December 23, 1790. Arriving in Boston in 1812, he worked as a printer for the Columbian Museum, at the time under the proprietorship of his uncle, Daniel Bowen. In 1814 Abel married Eliza Healey of Hudson, New York. Their children included Abel Bowen (d.1818).

With W.S. Pendleton he formed the firm of Pendleton & Bowen, which ended in 1826. He joined the Massachusetts Charitable Mechanic Association in 1828. In the 1830s Bowen and others formed the Boston Bewick Company, which published the American Magazine of Useful and Entertaining Knowledge. He lived and worked in Congress Square, ca.1823-1826; in 1832 he kept his shop on Water Street, and lived on Union Street; in 1849 he worked on School Street, and lived in Chelsea.

Bowen taught Joseph Andrews, Hammatt Billings, George Loring Brown, B.F. Childs, William Croome, Nathaniel Dearborn, G. Thomas Devereaux, Alonzo Hartwell, Samuel Smith Kilburn, and Richard P. Mallory. Contemporaries included William Hoogland. His siblings included publisher Henry Bowen. Bowen died on March 11, 1850 in Chelsea, Massachusetts.

== Works by Bowen ==
- Bowen, Abel (1816). The Naval Monument.
- Rufus Porter (c. 1822). Revolving Almanack. Billerica, Mass. Engraved by Abel Bowen.
- Bowen's Boston News-letter, and City Record. 1826.
- Early Impressions A novella published 1827, Bowles and Dearborn: Boston, and reprinted by Allen and Ticknor, Boston, 1833.
- Bowen's Picture of Boston, Boston: Abel Bowen, 1829, OCLC 76917747, OL 7113723M
  - Abel Bowen (1833), Bowen's Picture of Boston (2nd ed.), Boston: Lilly Wait & Co., OCLC 4530924, OL 6905755M
  - Abel Bowen (1838), Bowen's Picture of Boston (3rd ed.), Boston: Otis, Broaders and Company, OL 6905756M
- Young Ladies' Book. 1830.

== Images ==
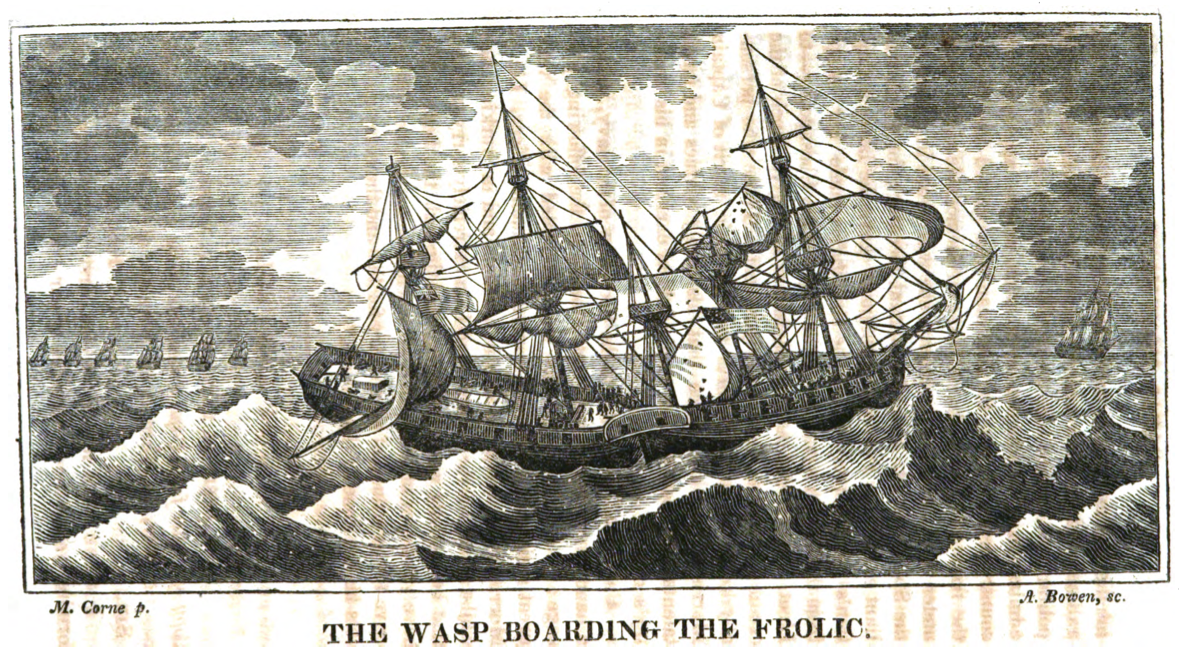
The Wasp Boarding the Frolic. Bowen's The Naval Monument, 1816

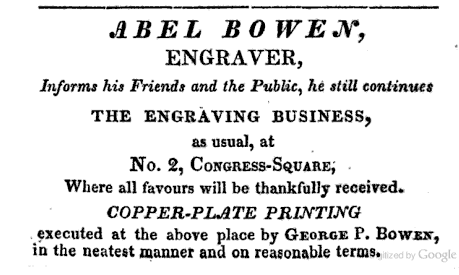
Office at Congress-Square; advertisement in Boston Directory, 1823

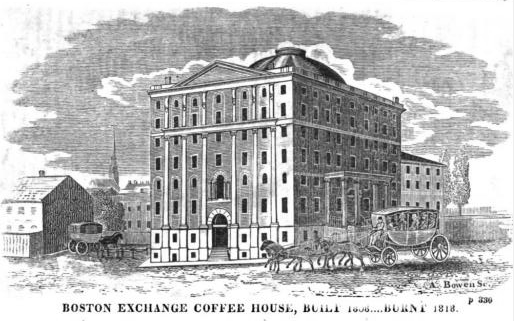
Engraving by Bowen of the Exchange Coffee House from Snow's History of Boston, 1828
