= William Croome =

American illustrator and wood engraver

William Croome (1790–1860) was an American illustrator and wood engraver in the 19th century. He trained with Abel Bowen in Boston, Massachusetts. Croome's work appeared in the American Magazine of Useful and Entertaining Knowledge (1830s), Lady's Annual (1830s), Crockett Almanac (ca.1840s), and in numerous children's books.

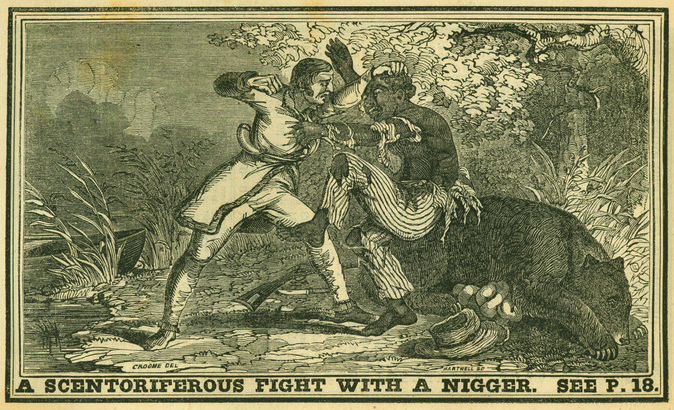
From: Crockett Almanac, 1839

== Works with illustrations by Croome ==
- The child's annual. Boston: Allen & Ticknor, 1834
- The Token and Atlantic Souvenir, 1836
- Caroline Howard Gilman. The Lady's annual register and housewife's memorandum book. Boston: 1837-1840.
- Crockett Almanac 1839. Containing Adventures, Exploits, Sprees & Scrapes in the West, & Life and Manners in the Backwoods. Nashville, Tennessee. Published by Ben Harding, 1838.
- John Stevens Cabot Abbott. The school-boy: or, A guide for youth to truth and duty. Boston: Crocker & Brewster, 1839.
- Jacob Abbott. Caleb in the country: A story for children. Boston: Crocker & Brewster, 1839
- Crockett Almanac Improved 1842. Boston. Printed and Published by S. N. Dickinson, 1841.
- John Frost. Book of the Navy. 1843
- John Frost. The pictorial history of the United States of America: from the discovery by the Northmen in the tenth century to the present time. ca.1843. 1852 ed. (Boston: H. Wentworth)
- John Frost. Panorama Of Nations. Auburn & Buffalo: John E. Beardsley, (1852).
- Graham's Magazine. Oct. 1844. Illustration to Charles J. Peterson's "The Pic-Nic: a Story of the Wissahicken." (Croome's interpretation described in 1983 by historian Burton Pollin: "simpering expressions and contrived postures, and ... overdressed characters")
- S.G. Goodrich. A pictorial natural history: embracing a view of the mineral, vegetable, and animal kingdoms; For the use of schools. Boston: James Munroe & Company, 1845. New edition (1854).
- William Spottswood White. The African preacher: An authentic narrative. Philadelphia: Presbyterian Board of Publication, 1849
- Songs for the People. 1849
- Clara Moreton (Clara Jessup Moore) Frank and Fanny: a rural story. Boston: Phillips, Sampson, 1851
- Falconbridge. Dan. Marble: a biographical sketch of that famous and diverting humorist, with reminiscences, comicalities, anecdotes, etc., etc. New York: Dewitt & Davenport, 1851. Google books
- Godey's Lady's Book

== Image gallery ==
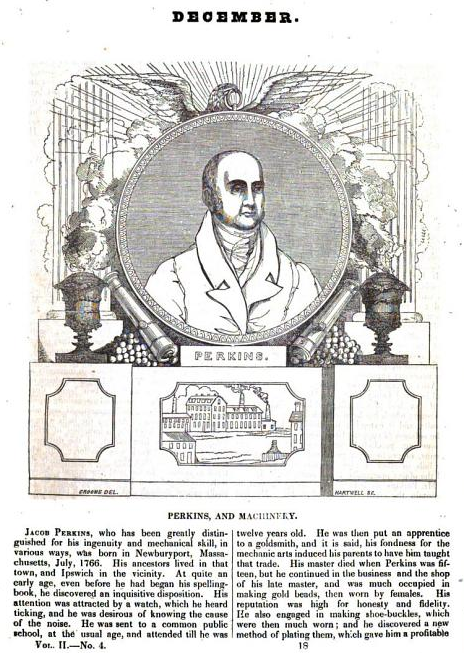
Portrait of Jacob Perkins in American Magazine of Useful and Entertaining Knowledge, 1835

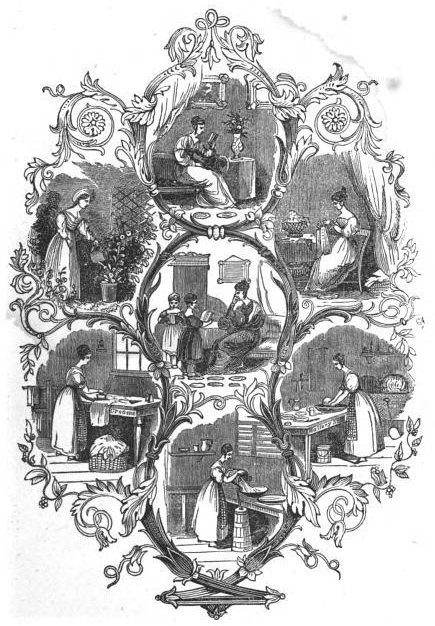
From: Caroline Howard Gilman's The Lady's Annual Register and Housewife's Memorandum Book, 1837

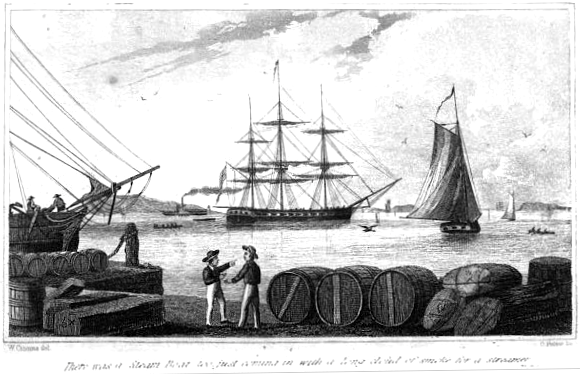
From: Jacob Abbott's Caleb in the Country, 1839

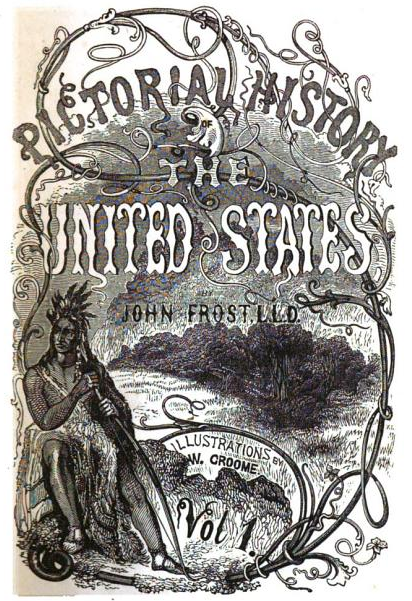
Frost's Pictorial History of the United States, illustrated by Croome, ca.1843

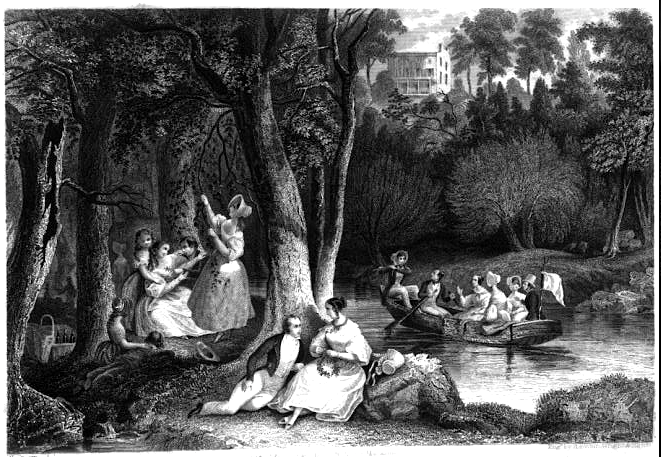
From: Graham's Magazine, Oct. 1844. Illustration to Charles J. Peterson's "The Pic-Nic: a Story of the Wissahicken."
