= Alonzo Hartwell =

American engraver and portrait artist

- Born: February 19, 1805; Littleton, Massachusetts
- Died: January 17, 1873 (aged 67); Waltham, Massachusetts
- Burial place: Mount Feake Cemetery
- Occupations: Engraver; portrait artist
- Children: Henry W. Hartwell

Alonzo Hartwell (February 19, 1805 – January 17, 1873) was an engraver and portrait artist in Boston, Massachusetts, in the 19th century.

== Biography ==
Hartwell was born February 19, 1805, in Littleton, Massachusetts. He trained with Abel Bowen in Boston and in 1826 went into business for himself. Hartwell's work appeared in the American Magazine of Useful and Entertaining Knowledge and other publications. Among Hartwell's students were artists George Loring Brown and Benjamin F. Childs. In 1850, he received the silver medal of the Charlestown, Massachusetts, Mechanics' Association. He continued as an engraver until 1851, when he turned to portrait painting.

One of Hartwell's children, Henry W. Hartwell, became an architect in the Boston firm Hartwell and Richardson. Hartwell died January 17, 1873, in Waltham, Massachusetts. He is buried in Mount Feake Cemetery in Waltham, Massachusetts.

== Image gallery ==
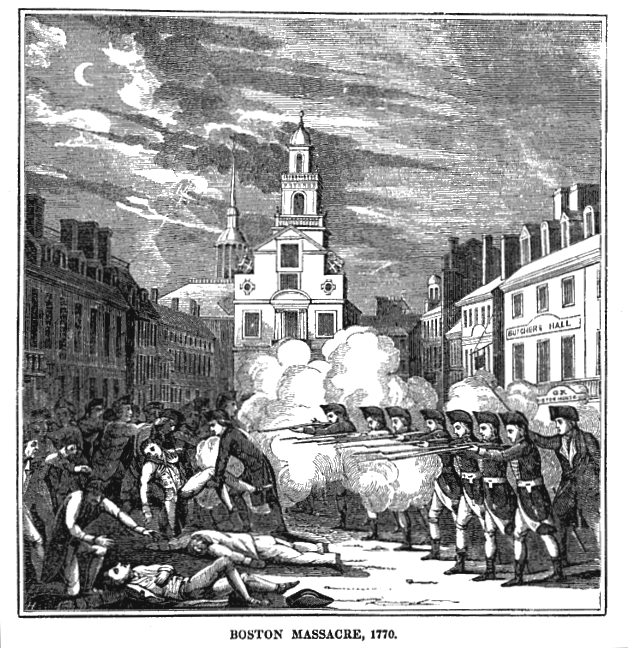
Boston Massacre (Note: In American Magazine of Useful and Entertaining Knowledge, 1835)

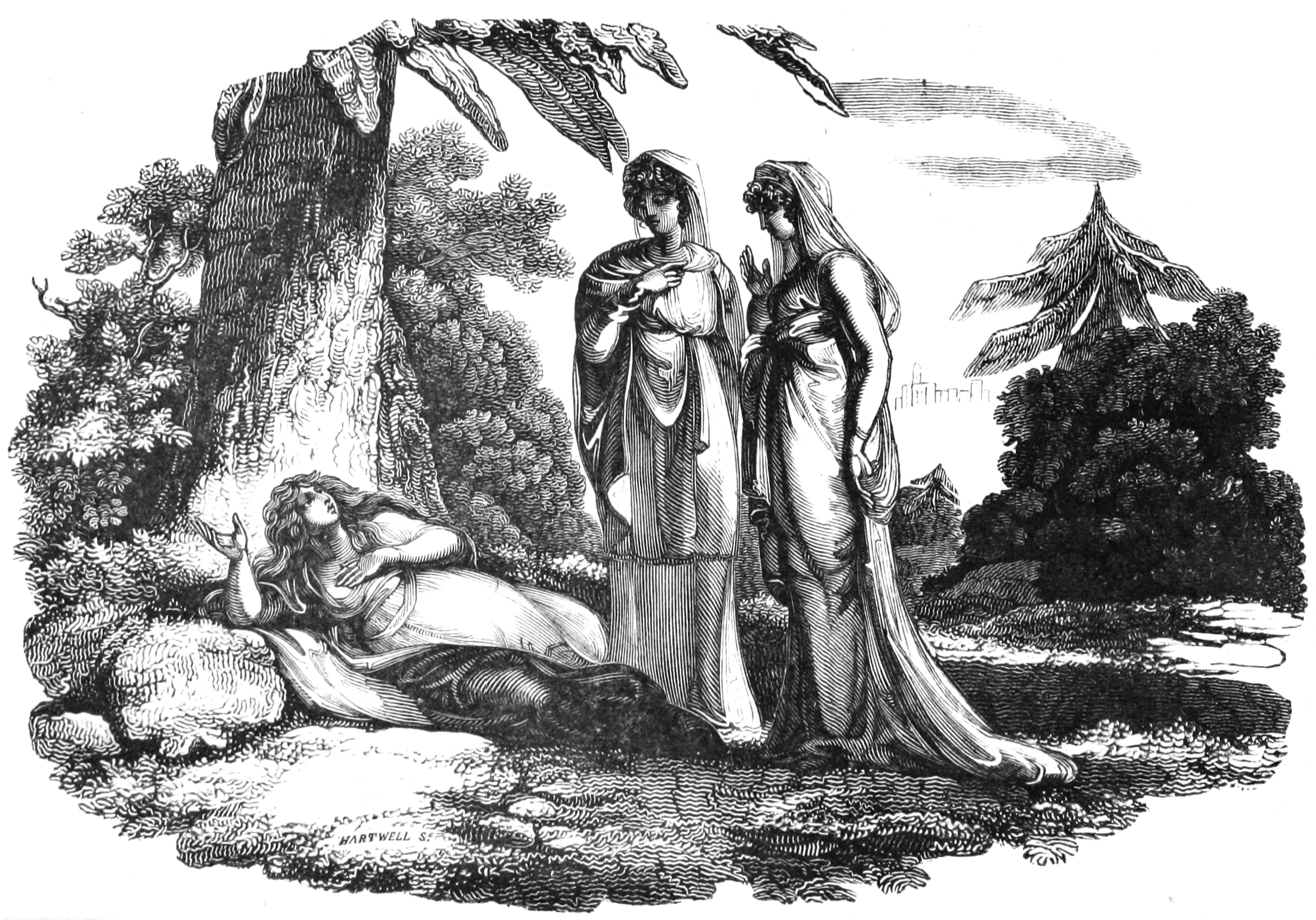
The Broken Hearted

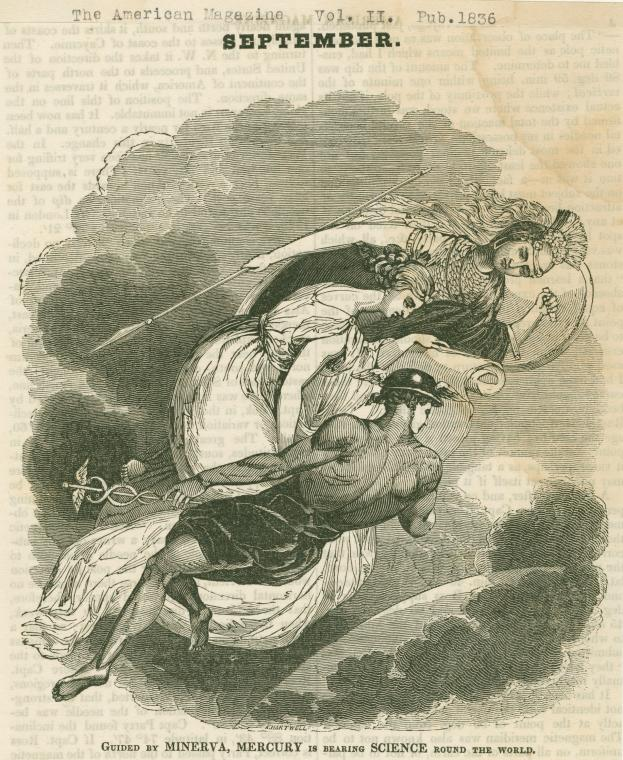
Guided by Minerva, Mercury is bearing Science round the world.

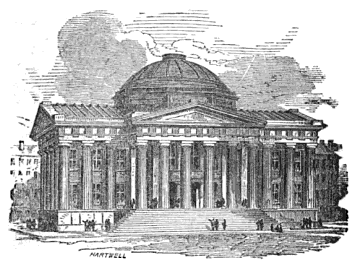
Boston Custom House, 1851

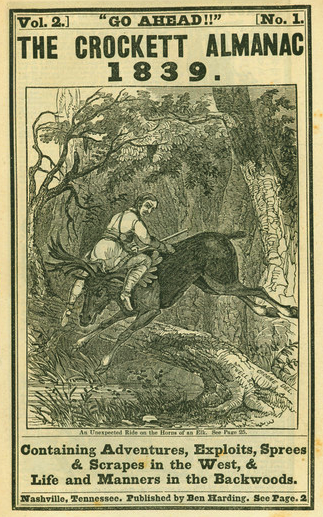
Davy Crockett, in The Crockett Almanac, 1839

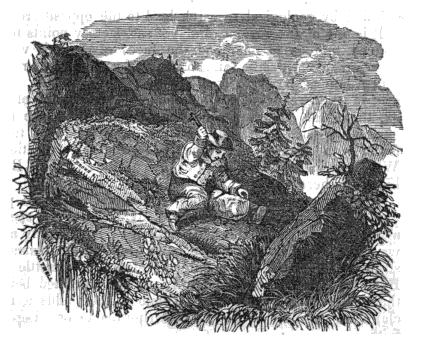
Mineralogy. (Note: From: S.G. Goodrich. A Pictorial Natural History (Boston: James Munroe & Company, 1854))

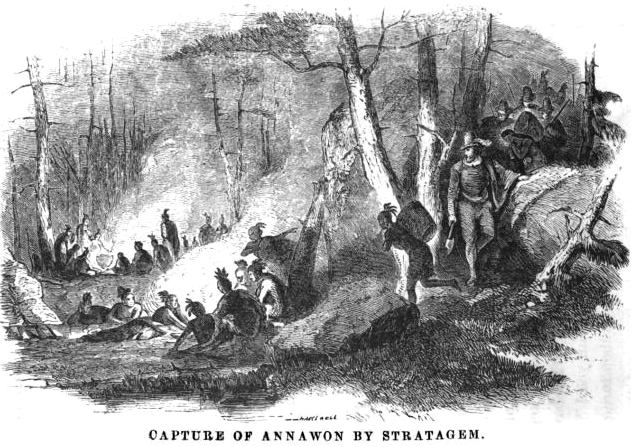
Capture of Annawon by Stratagem, 1856

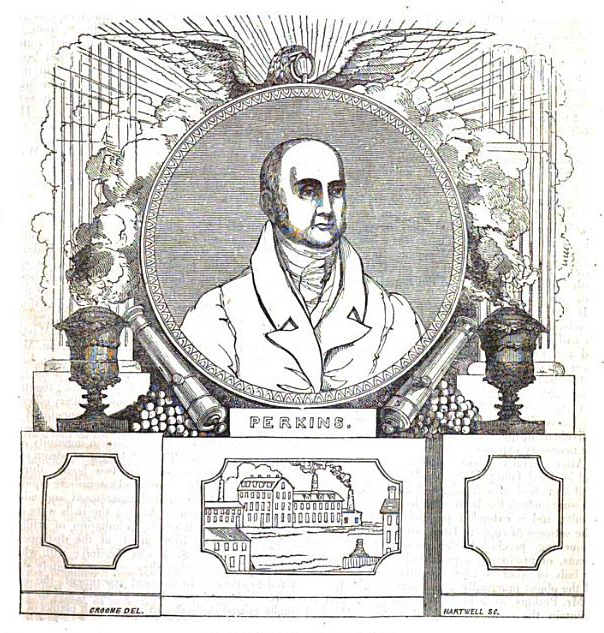
Portrait of Jacob Perkins. (Note: From: Croome, del.; Hartwell sc. Page from: American Magazine of Useful and Entertaining Knowledge. vol.2, 1835.)

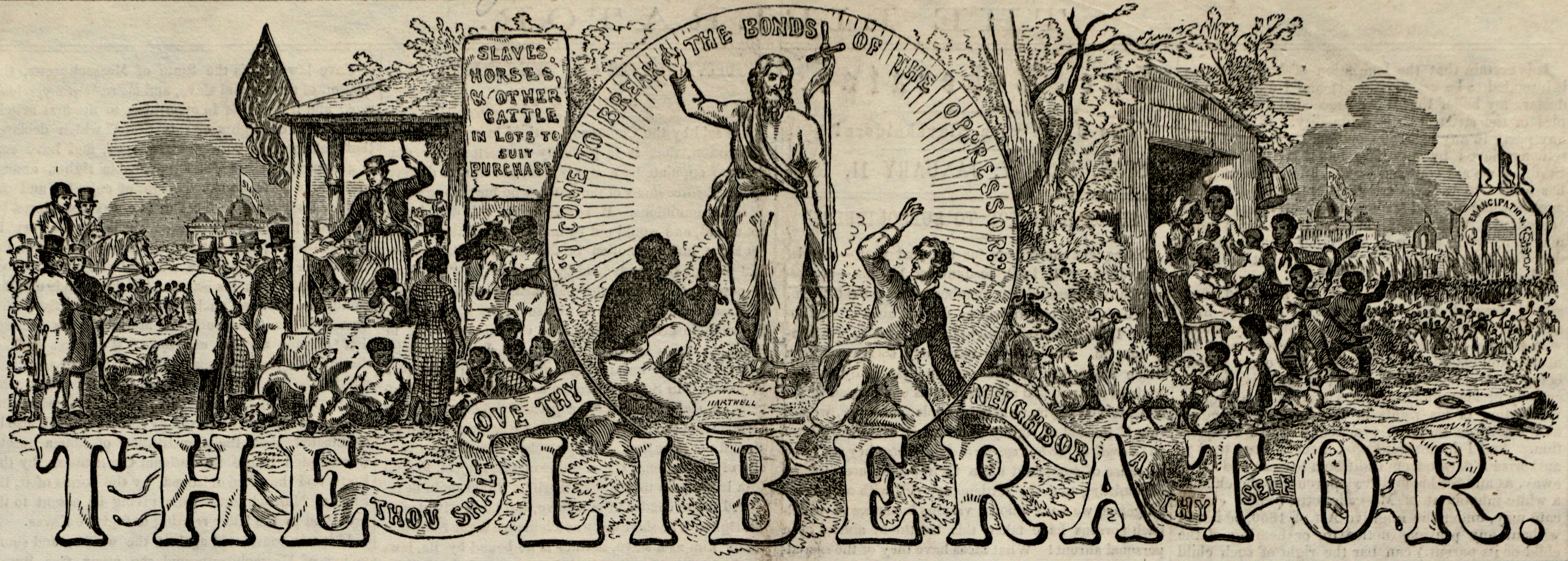
The Liberator masthead, 1861
