= Benjamin Dearborn =

American printer and mechanical inventor

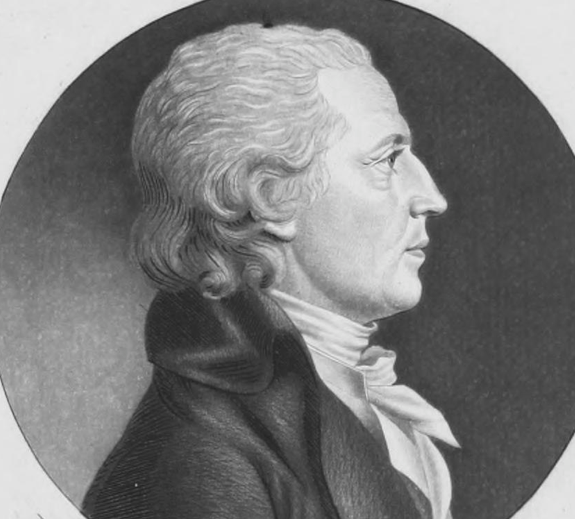
- Portrait of Dearborn, c.1803
- Born: 1754; Portsmouth, Province of New Hampshire, British America
- Died: February 22, 1838 (aged 83–84); Boston, Massachusetts, U.S.
- Occupations: Printer, inventor
- Known for: Inventing the gold standard balance, spring scale, ballot box, perspective drawing machine, and other mechanical devices
- Children: Nathaniel Dearborn

Benjamin Dearborn (1754–1838) was an American printer and mechanical inventor in Portsmouth, New Hampshire and Boston, Massachusetts in the late 18th and early 19th centuries. His inventions include the gold standard balance, spring scale, grist mill, candlestick, ballot box, perspective drawing machine, letter-press, "musical board for the instruction of the blind," thermoscope, vibrating steelyard balance, and perpendicular lift.

== Brief biography ==
=== Portsmouth 1754-ca.1791 ===
Dearborn was born in Portsmouth, New Hampshire, to Ruth Rogers (d.1791) and Benjamin Dearborn (1725-1755), a Harvard-educated doctor and descendant of Cornelius Van Ness Dearborn.

He trained as a printer with Daniel Fowle in Portsmouth. In May 1776, he became the publisher of the Freeman's Journal, or New Hampshire Gazette. While in Portsmouth he also ran a school; organized an "intelligence office;" sold Beverly Corduroy, India goods, real estate; and attempted a singing group.

=== Boston ca.1791-1838 ===
In the early 1790s he moved to Milk Street, Boston, where he continued inventing. Along with Paul Revere, Jeremy Belknap and others, he founded "The Committee on Machines" of the Massachusetts Charitable Fire Society in 1794. The same year he was elected a Fellow of the American Academy of Arts and Sciences. In 1797 Dearborn advertised as a surveyor and planner.

In 1818 he "invented a mode of propelling wheel carriages by steam, well calculated for the conveyance of the mail and any number of passengers, and which will be perfectly secure from robbers on the highway." He exhibited a "perpetual diary" in the first exhibition of the Massachusetts Charitable Mechanic Association in 1837.

He was a member of the American Philosophical Society and the Massachusetts Charitable Mechanic Association; and a benefactor of the Boston Dispensary (now Tufts Medical Center).

Dearborn died on February 22, 1838, in Boston. His children included John M. Dearborn, the engraver Nathaniel Dearborn, and Fanny Dearborn Hanman.

== Works by Dearborn ==
- The pupil's guide. Being a collection of the most useful rules in arithmetic. Portsmouth, N.H., 1782.
- A Description of a Pump-Engine, or an Apparatus to Be Added to a Common Pump. Memoirs of the American Academy of Arts and Sciences, Vol. 1, (1783), pp. 520–522.
- A scheme, for reducing the science of music to a more simple state: and to bring all its characters within the compass of a common fount of printing-types; especially calculated for the convenience of learners. Portsmouth New-Hampshire, 1785.
- The Columbian grammar : or, An essay for reducing a grammatical knowledge of the English language to a degree of simplicity which will render it easy for the instructor to teach ... Accompanied with notes, critical and explanatory. Boston: Printed by Samuel Hall, for the Author, 1795.
- The patent balance compared with other instruments for weighing. Philadelphia: Printed by Robert Cochran, 1803.
- Dearborn's system for weighing with ease, dispatch, and precision : purchased for half the cost, and used with half the labor, of scales and weights. Boston, 1804.
- Description of the manner of using Dearborn's Facility for casting interest. Boston: Gilbert & Dean, 1805.
- Remarks on the Construction of the Common Scale-Beam, with a Description of the New Gold Standard Beam, Invented by the Author. Memoirs of the American Academy of Arts and Sciences, Vol. 3, No. 1 (1809), pp. 40–50.
- Directions for using the gold standard balance invented by Benjamin Dearborn of Boston, Massachusetts. Boston, 1817.
- A lenient system for adjusting demands and collecting debts without imprisonment : uniting justice with clemency in coercive measures, for stimulating debtors to fulfil their contracts. Boston: John H. Eastburn, 1827.
- Singularity. Boston: B. Dearborn, 1830.
