= Gerald T. Horrigan =

American sculptor (1903–1995)

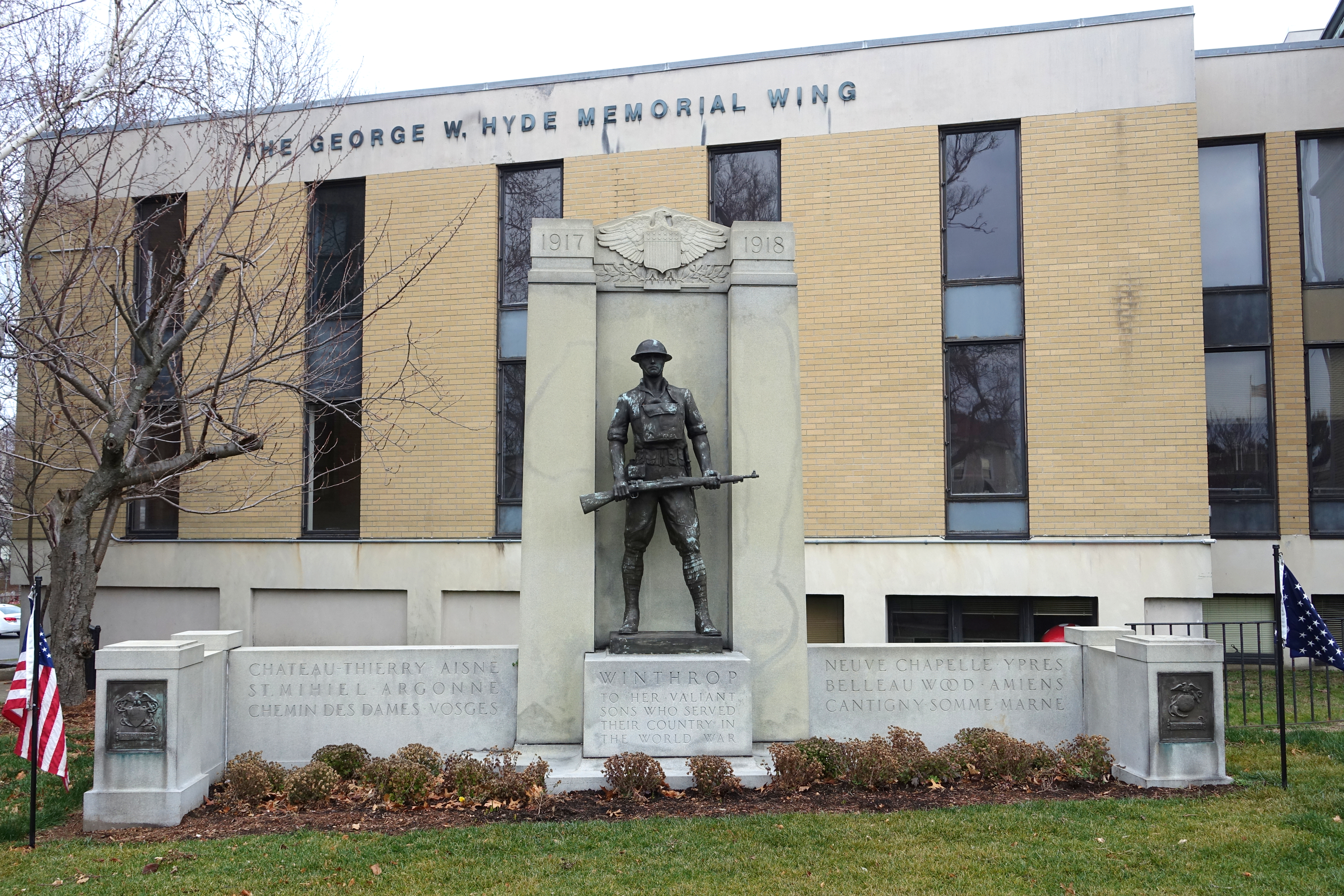
World War I Memorial in Winthrop, Massachusetts, by Gerald T. Horrigan

Gerald T. Horrigan (June 2, 1903 – June 30, 1995) was an American sculptor active in the Boston, Massachusetts area.

Horrigan was born in Quincy, Massachusetts, the son of sculptor John Horrigan. After graduating from Quincy High School, he studied at the Museum of Fine Arts, Boston from 1921 to 1925 under Charles Grady and Frederick W. Allen; during these years he created the World War I memorial in Hull, Massachusetts, and the design for Quincy's Robert Burns memorial (which was cut by his father).

In 1927 Horrigan departed for Paris, and during his four years in Europe he executed a number of works including the large monument to Columbus in Palos de la Frontera, Spain to designs by Gertrude Vanderbilt Whitney. Upon his return to Quincy, Horrigan executed a number of sculptures both in the area and elsewhere, including the Lee Family World War II Memorial Marker (Timmonsville, South Carolina), Thomas J. Watson for an IBM building in Endicott, New York, Joan of Arc (St. Paul's Cathedral, Worcester), the Coduri mausoleum in (Westerley, Rhode Island), the doughboy for the World War I monument in Pawtucket, Rhode Island, and the figure on the Boston Policemen's Monument, and memorial sculptures in Mount Wollaston Cemetery.

Horrigan died in the Quincy Nursing and Rehabilitation Center, and is buried in Mount Wollaston Cemetery.
