= Lawrence Hospital (Massachusetts) =

- Merrimack Health

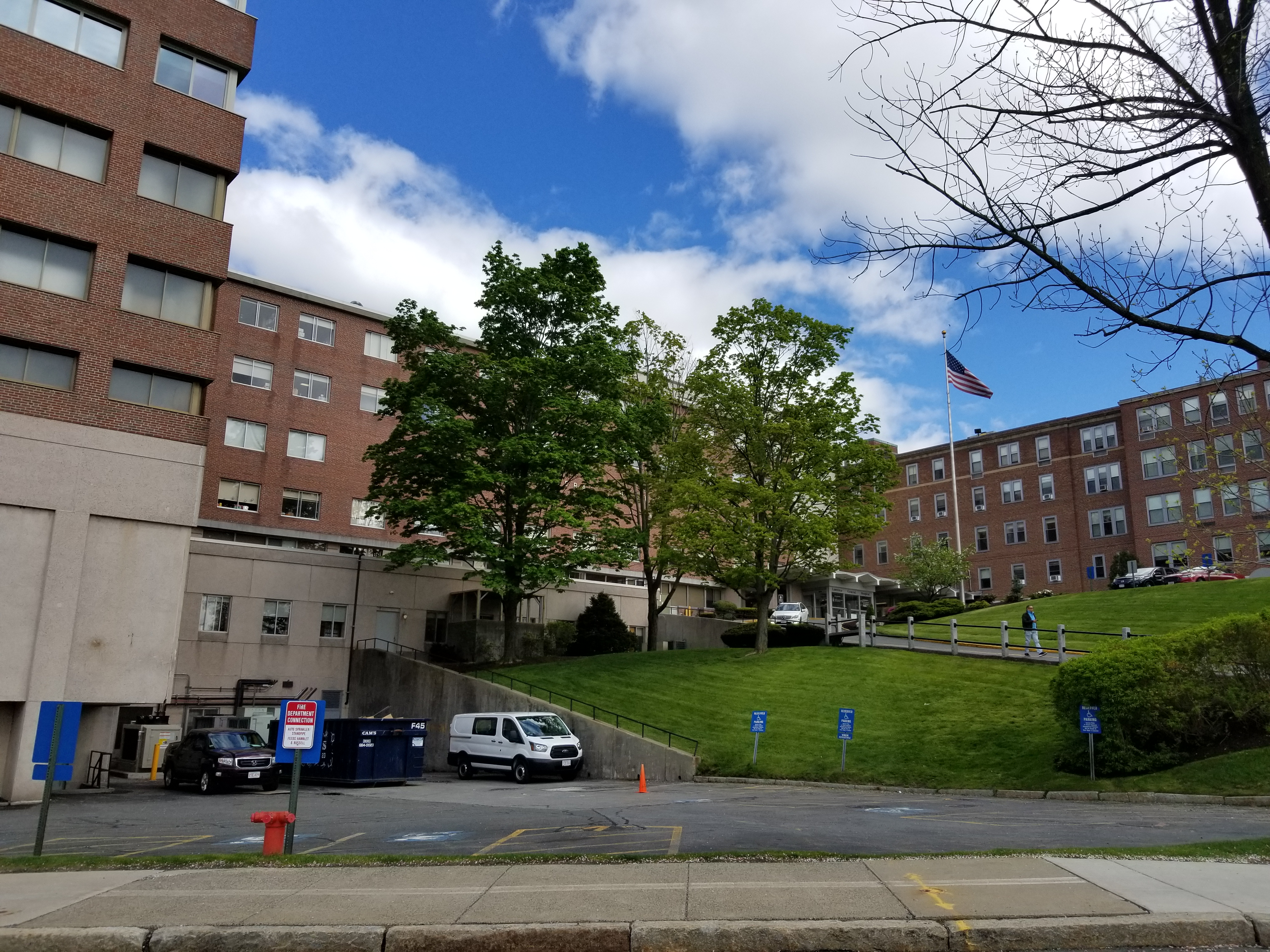

Geography
- Location: 1 General St,, Lawrence, MA, United States
- Coordinates: 42°42′36″N 71°9′1″W

Organization
- Care system: Private
- Type: Teaching
- Affiliated university: Tufts Medical Center
- Network: Merrimack Health

Services
- Emergency department: Level III Trauma Center
- Beds: 189

Helipads
- Helipad: (FAA LID: 16MA)
Number	Length		Surface
Number	ft	m	Surface
H1	75	23	Asphalt

History
- Former name: Lawrence General Hospital
- Founded: 1875

Links
- Website: http://www.mhlawrencehospital.org/
- Lists: Hospitals in the United States

Merrimack Health Lawrence Hospital (formerly Lawrence General Hospital) is a private non-profit hospital with 189 beds in Lawrence, Massachusetts. It was an affiliate of Tufts Children’s Hospital prior to its 2022 closing and is currently affiliated with Beth Israel Deaconess Medical Center, a Harvard Medical School teaching hospital. It is a founding member of Merrimack Health, which formed with two other hospitals in 2025.

== Facilities ==
Lawrence Hospital provides many different areas of patient care including inpatient Medical Surgical, Maternity, Labor and Delivery, Telemetry, in addition to many outpatient services. There is a new "41-bay Emergency Center, a new Imaging Center featuring the only "Ambient Imaging" technology in the State, a new, top-rated Cardiac Cath Lab, a new 4-suite Sleep Center, a new MITS Clinic, an expanded and fully renovated Pediatric Center in partnership with Floating Hospital for Children at Tufts Medical Center and an expanded Diabetes & Nutrition Education Center."

== History ==
The hospital was founded in 1875 as the first hospital in the Merrimack Valley by the Ladies' Union Charitable Society, a private group of Christian women in Lawrence. The hospital was originally led by Dr. Susan Elizabeth Wood Crocker as the region's first free "invalid home" and was founded in response to a scarlet fever outbreak and also to provide medical care during the day for the sick children of working mothers in the mills. The Lawrence General School of Nursing was founded in 1882 and operated until 1977. In 1899 the hospital moved from its earlier locations on Methuen Street and Montgomery Street to the donated estate of philanthropist, William A. Russell on Prospect Hill. In 1929 Philanthropist Harriet Nevins left a large bequest to the hospital. Large additions were made in 1941, 1958, 1963 1972, and in the 2000s.

In August 2024, amid the bankruptcy proceedings of the Steward Health Care system, Lawrence General was revealed to be a likely buyer for Steward's Holy Family Hospital, which operated across two campuses in Methuen and Haverhill. However, people familiar with the process indicated that Lawrence General would not be able to keep Holy Family's Haverhill campus open without assistance from the state.

In September 2025, Lawrence General became a founding member of Merrimack Health, a new health system covering itself and the Holy Family hospitals. As part of this reorganization, the hospital was renamed Lawrence Hospital. The Holy Family hospitals received similar rebrands.

== Notable people ==
- Susan Elizabeth Wood Crocker
