= Susan Elizabeth Wood Crocker =

Former American physician and professor

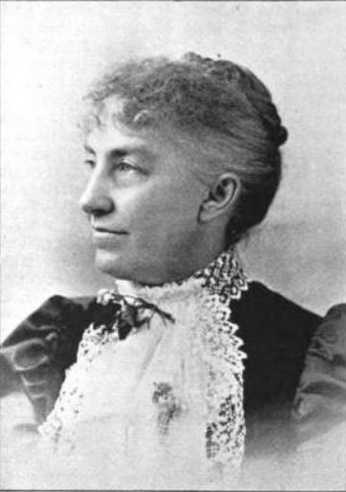
- Born: January 6, 1836; Halifax, Massachusetts
- Died: 1922 (aged 85–86)
- Education: Women's Medical College of the New York Infirmary
- Occupation: Physician
- Known for: First physician of Lawrence General Hospital
- Spouse: Charles F. Crocker (m. 1856)
- Children: 1

Susan Elizabeth Wood Crocker (January 6, 1836 – 1922) was an American physician and professor. After graduating from the Woman's Medical College of the New York Infirmary, in 1874, she began pioneer work as woman physician. She was a founder of the Lawrence General Hospital, its first physician, and the medical and surgical supervisor of all its departments. She also directed the establishment of the first free home for the infirm in Lawrence, Massachusetts.

== Early life and education ==
Susan Elizabeth Wood was born January 6, 1836, in Halifax, Massachusetts. She was the daughter of Nathan Thompson and Ann Maria (Kimball) Wood, and the granddaughter of William Wood. She was a descendant of Dr. Samuel Fuller, who emigrated from England in the Mayflower in 1620 and was the first physician and surgeon in the United States. She was also descended from Elder William Brewster of the Mayflower. Her siblings included Philander Wood, Christiana Wood, Newell Edgar Wood, and Erland Judson Wood.

Crocker's preliminary education was obtained at Pierce Academy in Middleborough, Massachusetts. She reportedly displayed an early desire to study medicine, but although a certain physician and his wife offered to take her into their family and educate her for the profession, she determined that she would not become a doctor of medicine until she could study in a medical college.

In 1856, she married Charles F. Crocker, of Lawrence, Massachusetts. Although not supposing that she would ever be able to realize her early wishes, she yet fitted herself in literature, history, natural science, and the languages, and in 1871, she took three full courses of medical lectures at the Woman's Medical College of the New York Infirmary, and graduated on April 18, 1874.

== Career ==
Crocker settled in Lawrence, and although her husband died in 1881, she continued to practice there until the autumn of 1888, when she removed to Boston, Massachusetts, where she continued to practice. She was on the regular staff of physicians and surgeons of the Lawrence General Hospital from its founding until she left the place. She became a professor of the principles and practice of medicine in the College of Physicians and Surgeons, Boston. She was elected a member of the American Association for the Advancement of Science in 1870; of the New England Woman's Club in 1875; a fellow of the Massachusetts Medical Society in 1887; a member of the Essex North Medical Society in 1887; of the Suffolk County Medical Society in 1888; and of the American Medical Association in 1888.

Crocker was the author of a paper on “Food Poisoning,” read before the Essex North District Medical Society, an abstract of which was published in the Boston Medical and Surgical journal (now The New England Journal of Medicine;) “The Medical Profession and the People,” read before the same society, May 6, 1891; “The Prevention of Disease,” read at Mechanics Building, Boston, in the literary and scientific course of the Massachusetts Charitable Association Fair, October, 1892, and afterward, published in Health.

== Personal life ==
In 1856, she married Charles F. Crocker, of Lawrence, who died 1881. They had one child, Annie Crocker.
