= Boston Dispensary =

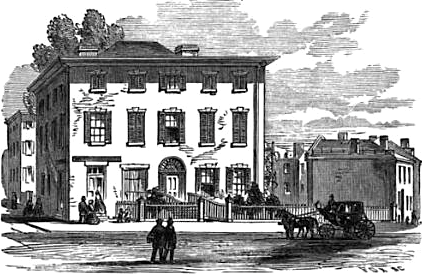
- Boston Medical Dispensary, corner Ash Street and Bennett Street, South End, Boston, 1859

Geography
- Location: Boston, Massachusetts, United States
- Coordinates: 42.34951°N 71.06331°W

History
- Opened: 1796

Links
- Lists: Hospitals in Massachusetts

The Boston Dispensary (est.1796) or Boston Medical Dispensary provided for "medical relief of the poor" in Boston, Massachusetts, from the late 18th century through the mid-20th century. It was one of the first hospitals in the United States. In the 1960s the Boston Dispensary merged with New England Medical Center and is now known as Tufts Medical Center.

== History ==
Founders included Jonathan Amory, John Andrews, William Brown, John Codman, Samuel Dunn, Stephen Gorham, John Coffin Jones, John Parker, Samuel Parker, William Shattuck, William Smith, Samuel Stillman, and Samuel West. Early benefactors included Benjamin Dearborn. The charity incorporated in 1801.

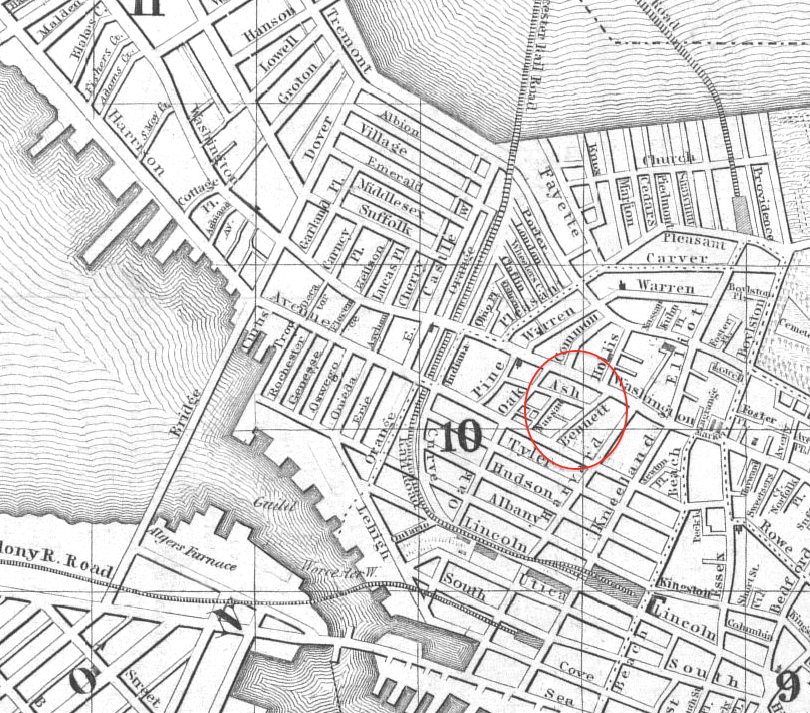
Detail of 1850 map of Boston, showing Bennett St. and Ash St. in the South End

By 1807, "the Boston Medical Dispensary, instituted in October, 1796, has afforded the means of relief to many necessitous persons, among others, whose feelings would have been hurt by an application for assistance from the alms house; as they are by this charity attended free of any expense by an able physician, either at their own houses, or at the Dispensary, as the case may require, and furnished with whatever medicine they may need, and with wine, if necessary. This institution is supported by subscriptions; the payment of 5 dollars annually, entitling tile subscriber to recommend two patients constantly to the care of the Dispensary. The town is divided into three districts; the southern comprehends all the south part of the town from the south side of Winter and Summer streets; the Middle from thence to the Mill creek, including West Boston; the Northern district all the north part of the town from the Mill bridge." Fundraising events took place at the Federal Street Theatre in 1821, and Doggett's Repository of Arts in 1823.

Through its history, there were many physicians who received their training at the Boston Dispensary including Oliver Wendell Holmes, James Jackson, Asa Bullard, Gamaliel Bradford, Pliny Hayes, Edward Warren, Henry Bowditch, Benjamin D. Appleton, Daniel Slade, E. Whitley Blake, and Buckminster Brown.

In addition to organizing the charitable provision of medical service throughout the city, the dispensary maintained a central clinic at no.76 Cornhill (ca.1823), no.138 Washington Street (ca.1832), and no.25 Bennett Street, at the corner of Ash Street (ca.1858-1911). A newly constructed clinic replaced the old building on the Bennett Street site in 1883.

"In the 1960s, the Boston Dispensary merged with the Floating Hospital for Children and the Pratt Diagnostic Clinic/Tufts Medical Center Hospital. It also formed alliances with Tufts University School of Medicine which serves as the principal teaching affiliate for the Medical Center."

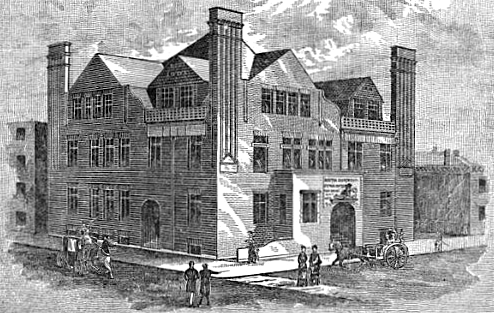
The Dispensary's central clinic on Bennett St., built 1883

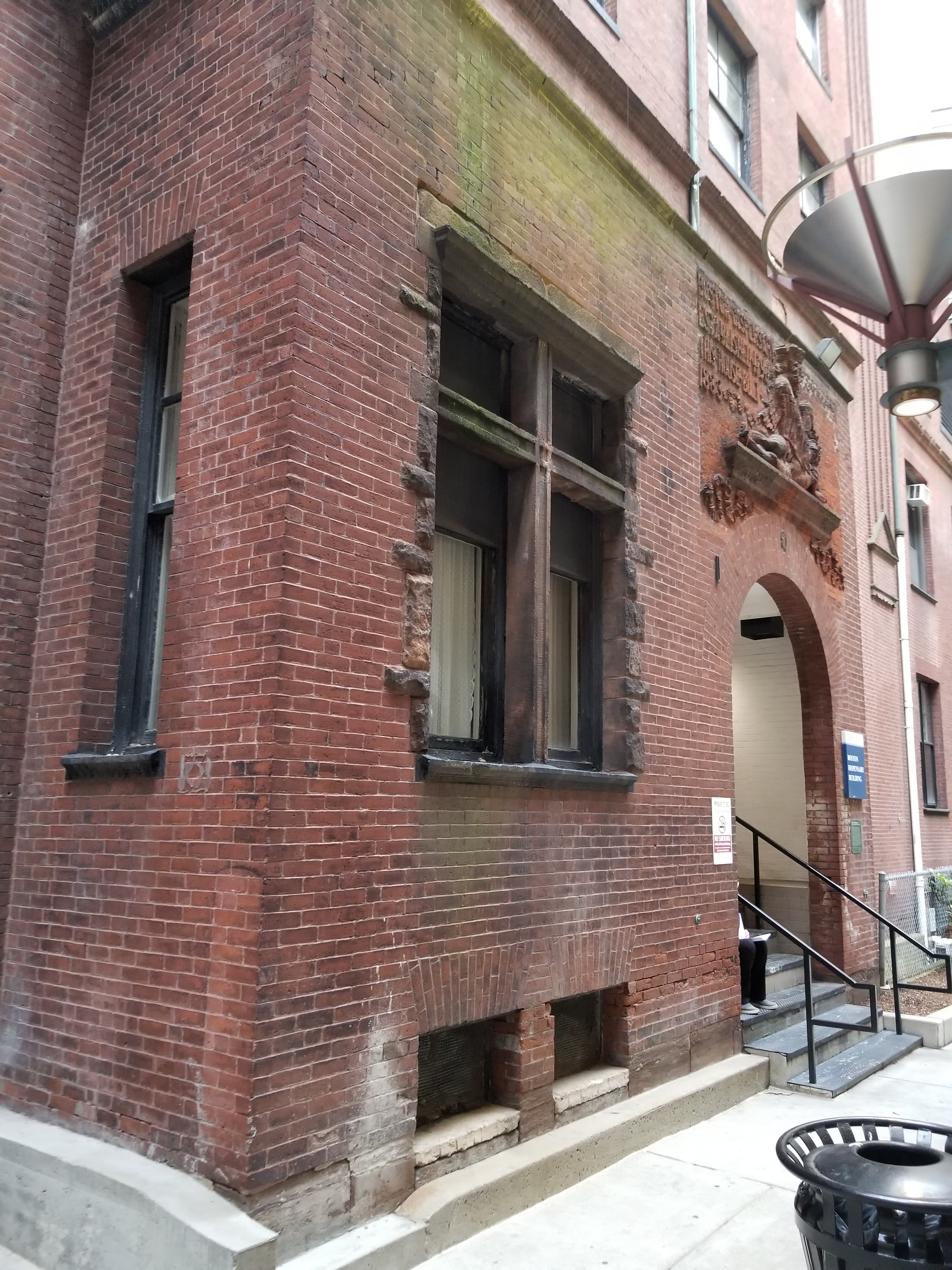
1883 Boston Dispensary building at Tufts Medical Center in 2019

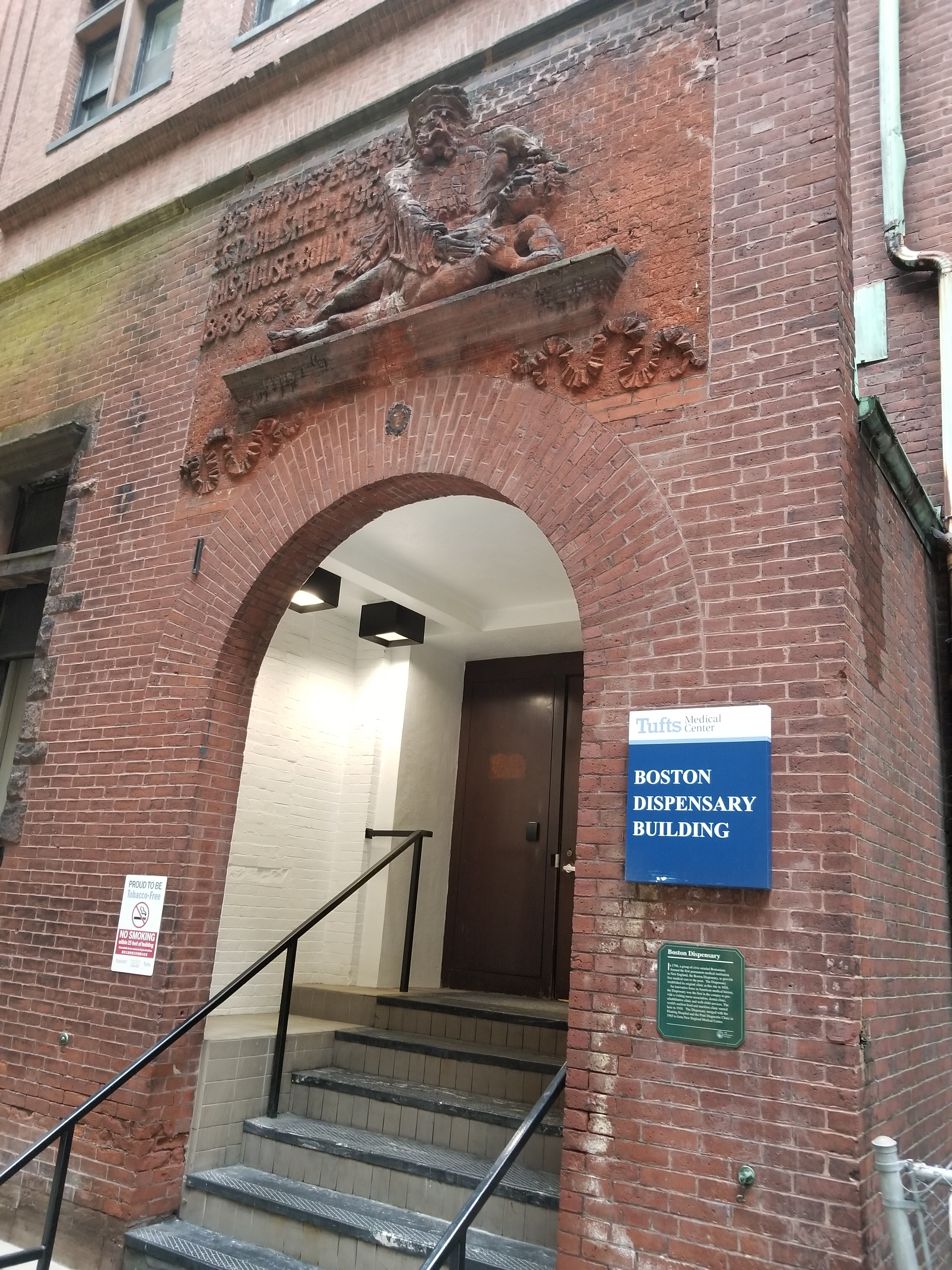
Carving of the Good Samaritan above door of 1883 building

== See also ==
- Tufts Medical Center, successor to the Boston Medical Dispensary
- List of the oldest hospitals in the United States
