= Rufus Tobey =

American pastor

Rufus Babcock Tobey (May 6, 1849 – January 6, 1920) was a Congregationalist pastor who founded the Floating Hospital for Children in Boston, which was later renamed Tufts Children's Hospital at Tufts Medical Center.

== Early life ==
Tobey was born in New Bedford, Massachusetts, on May 6, 1849. He was a tenth generation descendant of John and Priscilla Alden. After leaving school, he worked in New Bedford and Kingston, Massachusetts before moving to Boston, where he worked for R. H. White. Tobey attended Phillips Academy Andover and then Amherst College, graduating in the class of 1877. He then graduated from Andover Seminary in 1880.

== Ministry ==
On November 30, 1880, Tobey was ordained pastor of the Congregational church in Harwich, Massachusetts. In 1883, he moved to Helena, Montana, where he organized a Congregational church. He left Montana in 1885 and, after a short stint as a pastor in Carrington, North Dakota, returned to Massachusetts and became pastor of the church in Ashburnham. He later became an associate pastor at the Berkeley Temple in Boston. While at Berkeley, he developed a friendship with Dr. Edward Everett Hale, who supported Tobey's efforts to establish the Floating Hospital for Children. Tobey resigned in 1895 to focus on his philanthropic works.

== Floating Hospital for Children ==
In 1894, inspired by the St. John's Guild's Floating Hospital in New York City, Tobey began plans for a similar institution in Boston. The Floating Hospital would take underprivileged children and their mothers on a day's outing on Boston Harbor, where they would get the fresh ocean air and be seen at no charge by volunteer doctors and nurses. The first excursion took place on July 25, 1894. In 1905, the hospital was upgraded to a larger hospital ship which contained an inpatient unit, a pediatric nursing school, and research facility.

== Other work ==
Tobey helped found the Ingleside Home for young girls in Revere, Massachusetts and the Mount Pleasant Home, a Boston nursing home. He was also a director of the Watch and Ward Society and the Massachusetts Municipal League. He was also associated with the Howard Benevolent Society and was active in the temperance movement.

== Personal life and death ==
On June 21, 1882, Tobey married Caroline Mary Gifford. She died on April 3, 1890. On May 12, 1892, he married her sister, Genevive Rebecca Gifford. They had one daughter - Avis Caroline Tobey. In 1910, Tobey became the guardian of Esther Fogg, a fourteen-year-old girl who was pregnant by Walter G. Fall, who was 24-years-old. Tobey petitioned the court to allow Fogg to marry Fall, but was denied by a judge. Fall shot and killed Fogg's stepfather and a police officer while he was awaiting trial for sexually assaulting Fogg.

Tobey died on January 6, 1920, in Middleborough, Massachusetts after a long illness. He was buried at Mount Wollaston Cemetery in Quincy, Massachusetts.
