= Lend A Hand Society =

- Original logo
- Formation: 1891
- Founder: Edward Everett Hale
- Founded at: Boston, Massachusetts
- Headquarters: Boston, Massachusetts
- Website: https://www.lend-a-hand-society.org/

Ten times one is ten, the inspiration for LAH

Lend A Hand Society (LAH) is a nonprofit organization, founded by the author, philosopher, activist, and minister Edward Everett Hale. Lend A Hand has served the Greater Boston area since 1891, providing financial assistance to people in emergency situations. Working in partnership with over 130 local nonprofit organizations, Lend A Hand Society helps struggling families and individuals maintain housing stability and meet their basic needs, enabling them to stay in their community.

== History ==
Lend A Hand Society began when small clubs formed in response to the publication of a book titled Ten Times One is Ten, written by Edward Everett Hale in 1870. In the story, ten friends vow to “lend a hand” and recruit ten others to create a cascade of helping others, with the hope to eventually ending suffering and accomplishing world peace. They follow Hale's four mottos: “Look Up and Not Down, Look Forward and Not Back, Look Out and Not In, Lend a Hand!”

Throughout the years, there have been as many as 800 independent, nonsectarian Lend A Hand charitable clubs with a variety of names in the U.S. and overseas. The office of Edward Everett Hale, then minister of Boston's South Congregational Church, became a clearinghouse for communications between the clubs as well as publishing related magazines, newsletters, and annual reports.

On November 20, 1891, the Ten Times One Corporation was legally formed to be the central headquarters of Clubs. Its name was formally changed to Lend A Hand Society in 1898. Lend A Hand solicited and received funds from its Clubs for national and international emergencies. For example, in 1918 a plea was sent to the Clubs urging them to help others in their communities affected by influenza. In 1923 a letter circulated in response to the Great Kanto Earthquake in Japan urging Clubs to collect money and clothing to send to the office or the Red Cross. In addition to helping in emergency situations, there was support over several decades beginning in 1907 for Dr. Wilfred Grenfell for his medical services to Labrador, including books for traveling libraries and outfitting a medicine chest to accompany the Grenfell Mission on a hospital ship in summers and on a sled in winters.

Closer to home, in 1894 Edward Everett Hale and Rufus Tobey founded The Boston Floating Hospital with the administrative help of Lend A Hand Society. In the spring of 1896, a coalition was formed with the Lend A Hand Society, by which the Hospital obtained the advantages of incorporation. Donations were collected at the Lend A Hand central office, and eventually the project grew and evolved with new medical understandings of pediatric patients. Over time the Boston Floating Hospital for Children became an independent organization, before later becoming part of Tufts Medical Center.

The day-to-day work of the Society was in collaboration with other relief agencies, providing aid. Wheelchairs and hospital equipment were loaned to those in need, layettes were given to new mothers, and “gentlewomen” were enabled to earn some money by sewing garments to be distributed primarily to hospitals and the Red Cross. “The hardship of four women during the winter has been partly relieved by weekly sewing of cut-out garments sent us by the Children's Hospital, and by a warm friend of the New England Grenfell Association. This cooperation has rendered a threefold service. The expense has been met by contributions of Clubs and friends.” From 1913 to 1933, home sewing was a way to provide women with ways to create their own income.

The work undertaken by Lend A Hand varied in scope from operating the Noon-Day Rest, a lunchroom for Boston's working women from 1893 to 1899, to what later became one of the central aspects of Lend A Hand's work, sending books to schools and libraries in the rural South.

For 50 years (roughly 1929–1979), Lend A Hand Society loaned wheelchairs to individuals and social workers. Demand for both short and long term usage was great during this time, leading to waiting lists for wheelchairs. On one occasion, a donor even bought a much needed wheelchair for LAH as a memorial gift due to the short supply. Today, LAH provides support for wheelchairs through financial emergency assistance grants to those who need help paying for wheelchair purchases or repair.

Initially a membership organization with individuals as well as clubs’ dues supporting its work, the clubs diminished, with the rise of social service groups and government welfare programs. In 2008 Lend A Hand legally changed from being a membership organization to a nonprofit organization supported by grants from foundations, donations from individuals, and income from an endowment.

Lend A Hand historical archives are housed at the Massachusetts Historical Society and are available for research and viewing purposes.

== Present-day mission and programs ==
Although the work of Lend A Hand has changed over its more than 130 years, the primary mission remains one of providing emergency assistance to people in need in the Greater Boston area. Case managers from over 130 partner nonprofit organizations including hospitals, legal services agencies, housing organizations, senior care agencies, homeless shelters, veterans services, domestic violence programs in the Greater Boston area make requests on behalf of their clients for a variety of urgent needs such as rent and/or utilities payments in arrears, moving or ID assistance, medical equipment not covered otherwise.

In addition, Lend A Hand has two vestigial service programs from the early 20th century

- The book mission, which began in 1890 and was founded by Sarah Brigham, sent thousands of books to school and prison libraries and bookmobiles in the South.
- A respite program originally called “Outings for Old Men,” which has become a summer camp scholarship program for underserved youth

LAH is supported primarily by donations from the community.
