= Mount Wollaston Cemetery =

Historic cemetery in Massachusetts, United States

- U.S. National Register of Historic Places
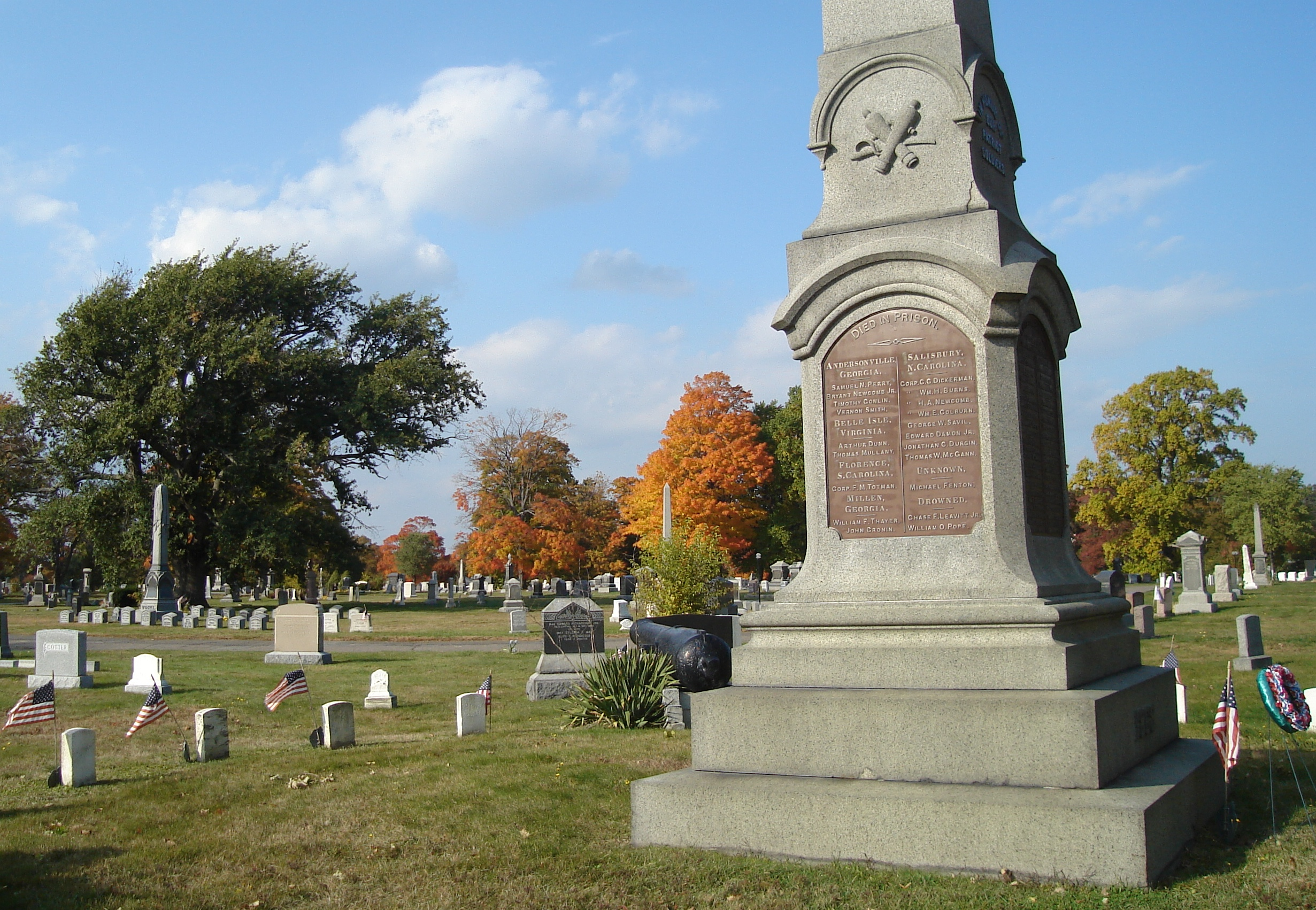

- Location within Massachusetts Location within the United States
- Location: 20 Sea Street, Quincy, Massachusetts
- Coordinates: 42°15′31″N 70°59′56″W
- Built: 1855
- Architect: Briggs, Luther; Briggs, Daniel.
- Architectural style: Gothic Revival
- NRHP reference No.: 94000035
- Added to NRHP: February 18, 1984

Mount Wollaston Cemetery is a historic rural cemetery at 20 Sea Street in the Merrymount neighborhood of Quincy, Massachusetts. It was founded in 1855 and added to the National Register of Historic Places in 1984.

== History ==
In 1854, when Hancock Cemetery in the center of the town had been filled to near capacity, a committee was formed at a town meeting to determine the site of a new burial ground. The committee chose a plot of land in the town farm, which had been donated by William Coddington and was located just west of the site of Quincy's founding spot, Mount Wollaston. Through the year the cemetery committee surveyed several cemeteries in the surrounding area for landscaping and architecture ideas, including Forest Hills Cemetery in Jamaica Plain and Mount Auburn Cemetery in Cambridge. After consulting with Superintendent Brims of Forest Hills, Luther Briggs of Dorchester was hired to design and build the cemetery. Briggs chose a Gothic Revival style for the architecture, and used the plot dimensions adopted by Mount Auburn as a template for Mount Wollaston. The first two plots were ceremoniously purchased on May 5, 1856 by Charles Francis Adams, Sr., prominent attorney and son of the late former President of the United States, John Quincy Adams.

== Monuments ==
An area known as the Veterans Section, located at the main Sea Street entrance to the cemetery, features several monuments honoring members of the military. The Civil War Monument, dedicated June 25, 1868, features a large granite monument surrounded by four period cannons. Other memorials include a Spanish–American War Memorial, World War I, World War II, Korean War and Vietnam War Memorials and statuary monuments dedicated to the city's firemen and policemen.

== Notable burials ==
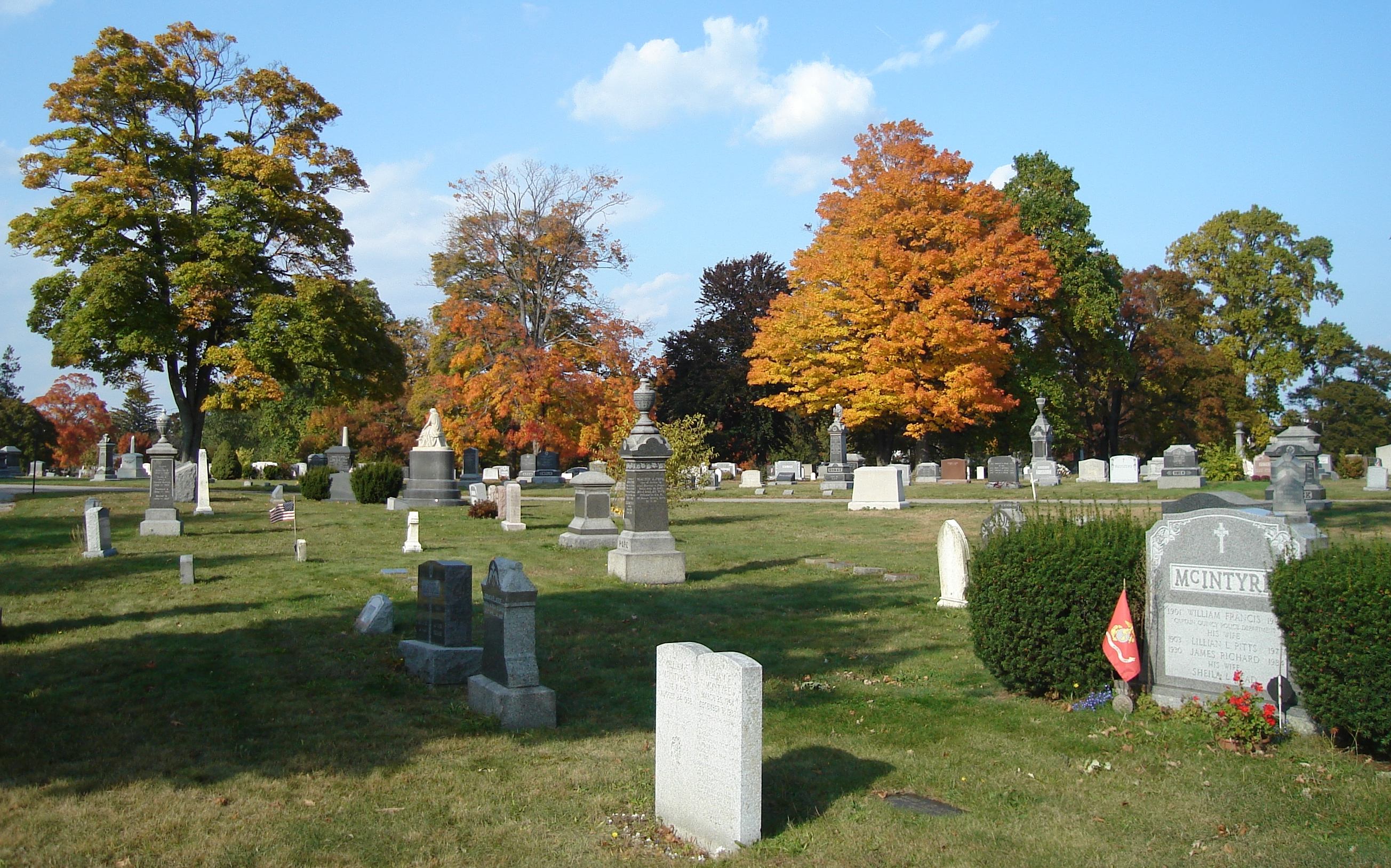

- Brooks Adams (1848–1927), historian
- Charles Francis Adams Sr. (1807–1886), attorney, U.S. Congressman and ambassador to Great Britain
- Charles Francis Adams Jr. (1835–1915), a Union commander in the American Civil War, railroad executive and historian
- Charles Francis Adams III (1866–1954), yachtsman and Secretary of the Navy under President Herbert Hoover
- John Quincy Adams II (1833–1894), a politician, soldier, and lawyer
- Billy De Wolfe (1907–1974), actor
- Bob Gallagher (1928–1977), sportscaster
- Ralph Talbot (1897–1918), first United States Marine Corps aviator to be awarded the Medal of Honor
- Rufus Tobey, (1849–1920), founder of Tufts Childrens Hospital
- Harriet E. Wilson (1825–1900), considered the first female African-American novelist
- Dr. Charles Purvis (1842–1929), African-American physician, notable for treating President James Garfield

== See also ==
- National Register of Historic Places listings in Quincy, Massachusetts
