= Nathaniel Dearborn =

American artist (1786–1852)

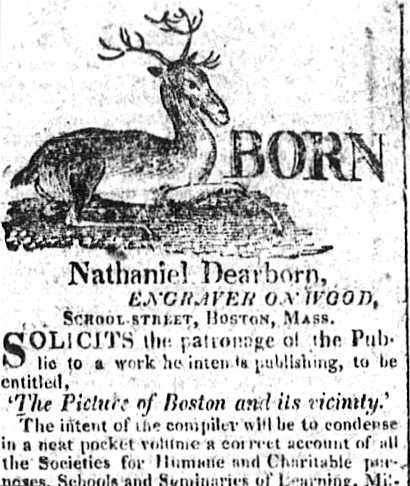
1814 advertisement

Nathaniel Dearborn (1786 – November 7, 1852) was an American engraver.

== Biography ==
He was born in New England, in 1786, to inventor Benjamin Dearborn; siblings included John M. Dearborn and Fanny Dearborn Hanman. He later moved to Boston, learning engraving from Abel Bowen. By 1814, Dearborn worked from quarters on School Street; later moving to Market Street (ca.1823), State Street (ca.1826–1831) and Washington Street (ca.1832–1852). Around 1830, he also gave musical lessons on the flute.

He died November 7, 1852, in South Reading. His son, Nathaniel S. Dearborn, continued as an engraver and printer in Boston, working on Water Street (ca.1847–1851) and School Street (ca.1857–1868). N.S. Dearborn exhibited several printed specimens in the 1850 exhibition of the Massachusetts Charitable Mechanic Association. His grandson S.B. Dearborn also worked as a printer.

== Works by Dearborn ==
- Views from the Mass. State House, Boston. ca.1838.
- American Textbook for Letters. 1842.
- Boston Notions; an Account of That Village from 1630 to 1847. 1848
- Dearborn's Reminiscences of Boston, and Guide through the City and Environs. 1851
- Dearborn's Guide through Mount Auburn. 1857

== Images ==
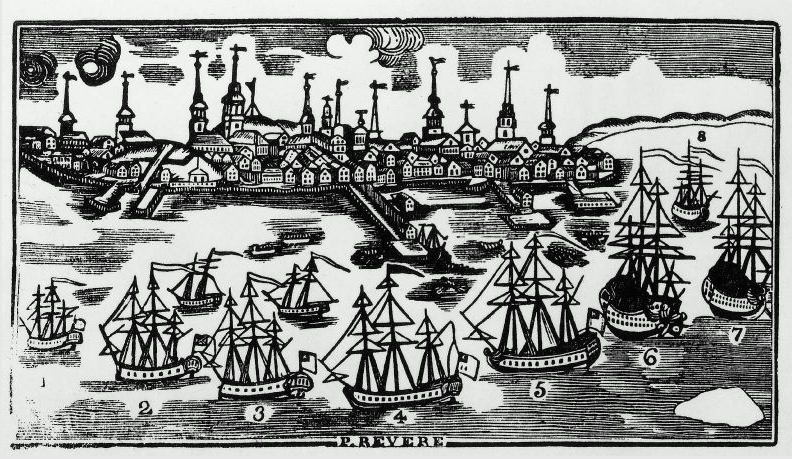
View of Boston, woodcut by Dearborn

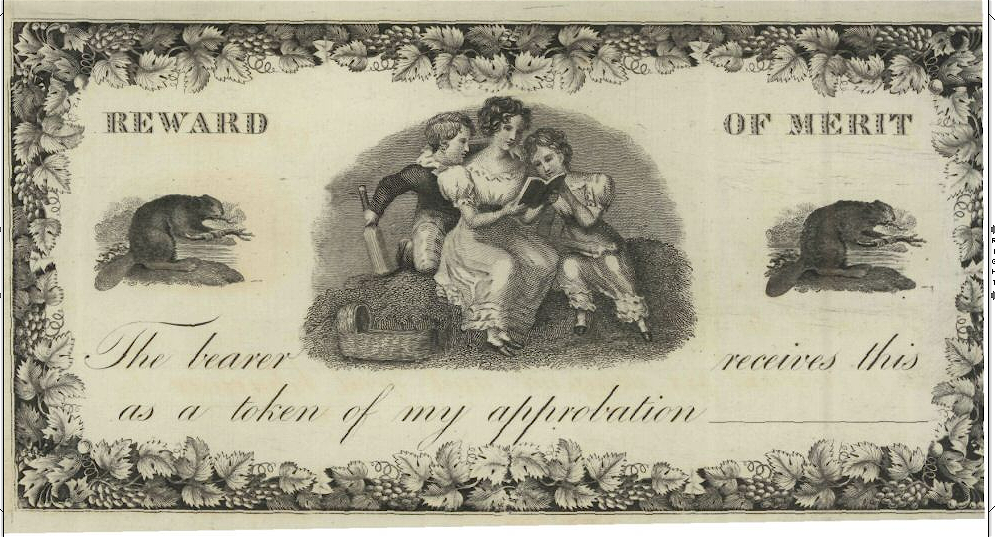
Printed by Dearborn & Son

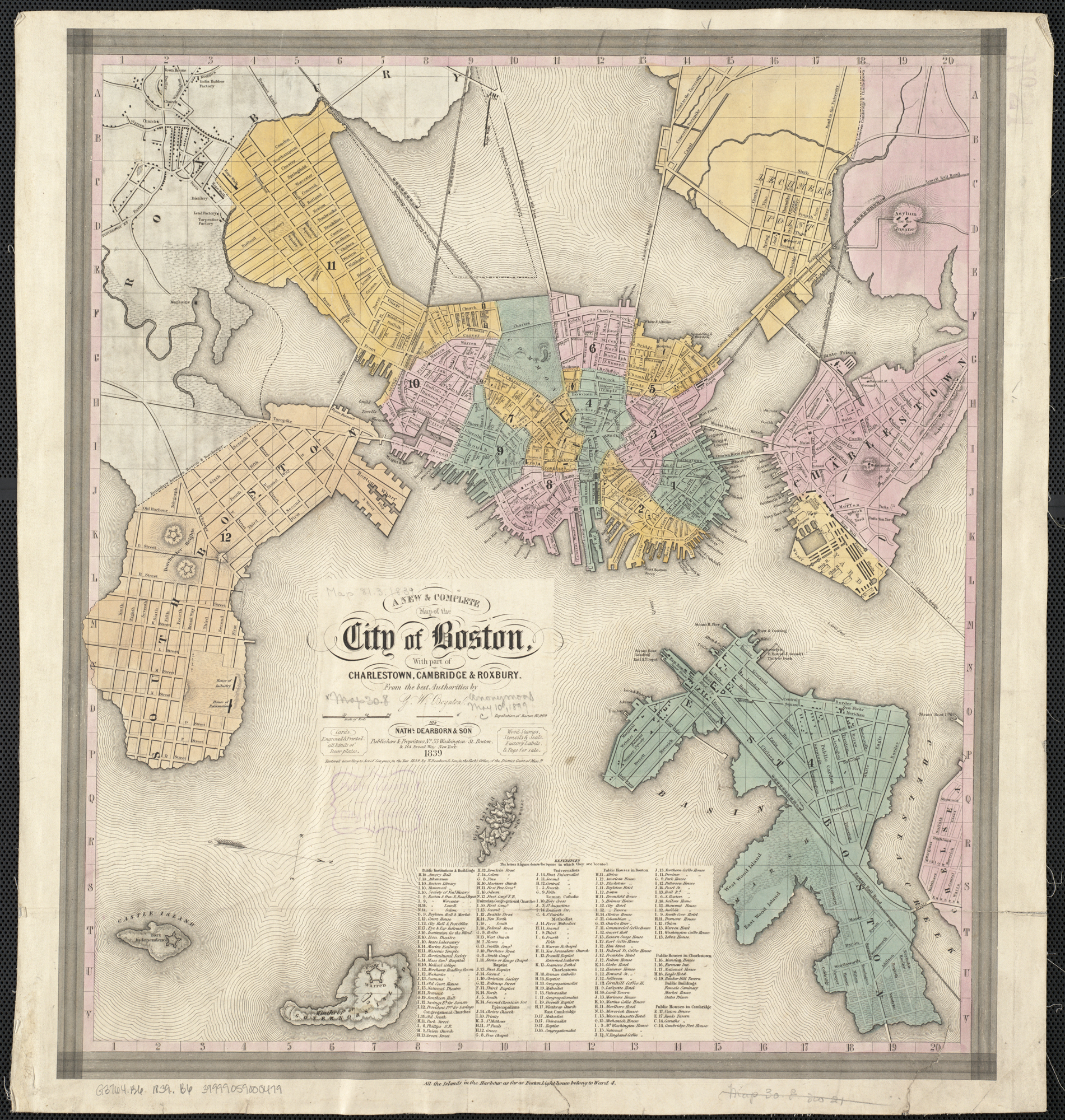
1839 map of Boston, printed by Dearborn & Son

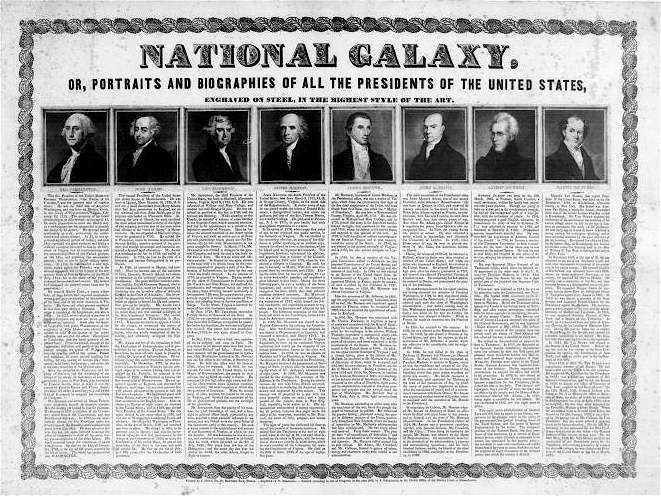
Published by N. Dearborn, 1840

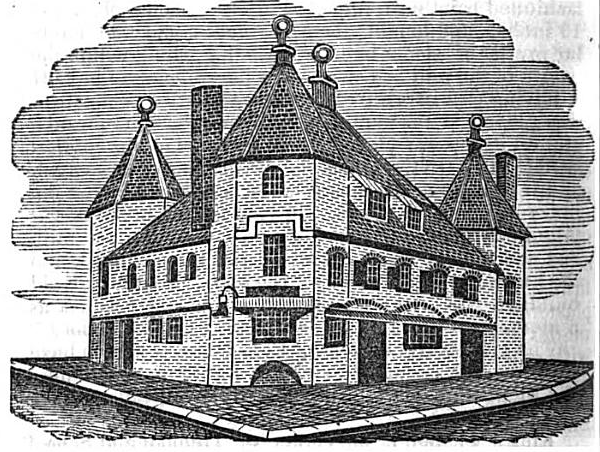
Triangular Warehouse, Merchants Row. Reminiscences of Boston, 1851
