= The Home for Little Wanderers =

Nonprofit organization in Massachusetts

The Home for Little Wanderers is a private non-profit child and family service agency in Boston, Massachusetts. Founded as an orphanage in 1799, it is the oldest agency of its kind in the United States. Today, the home plays a role in delivering services to thousands of children and families each year through a system of residential, community-based and prevention programs, direct care services and advocacy.

The Home's services include early intervention and prevention, foster care and adoption, clinical services, residential care, special education, and home-based family support.

== See also ==
- Boston Female Asylum, precursor to the Home
