= Samuel Parker (bishop of Massachusetts) =

18th-century American Episcopal bishop

The Right Reverend Samuel Parker D.D.
- Bishop of Massachusetts
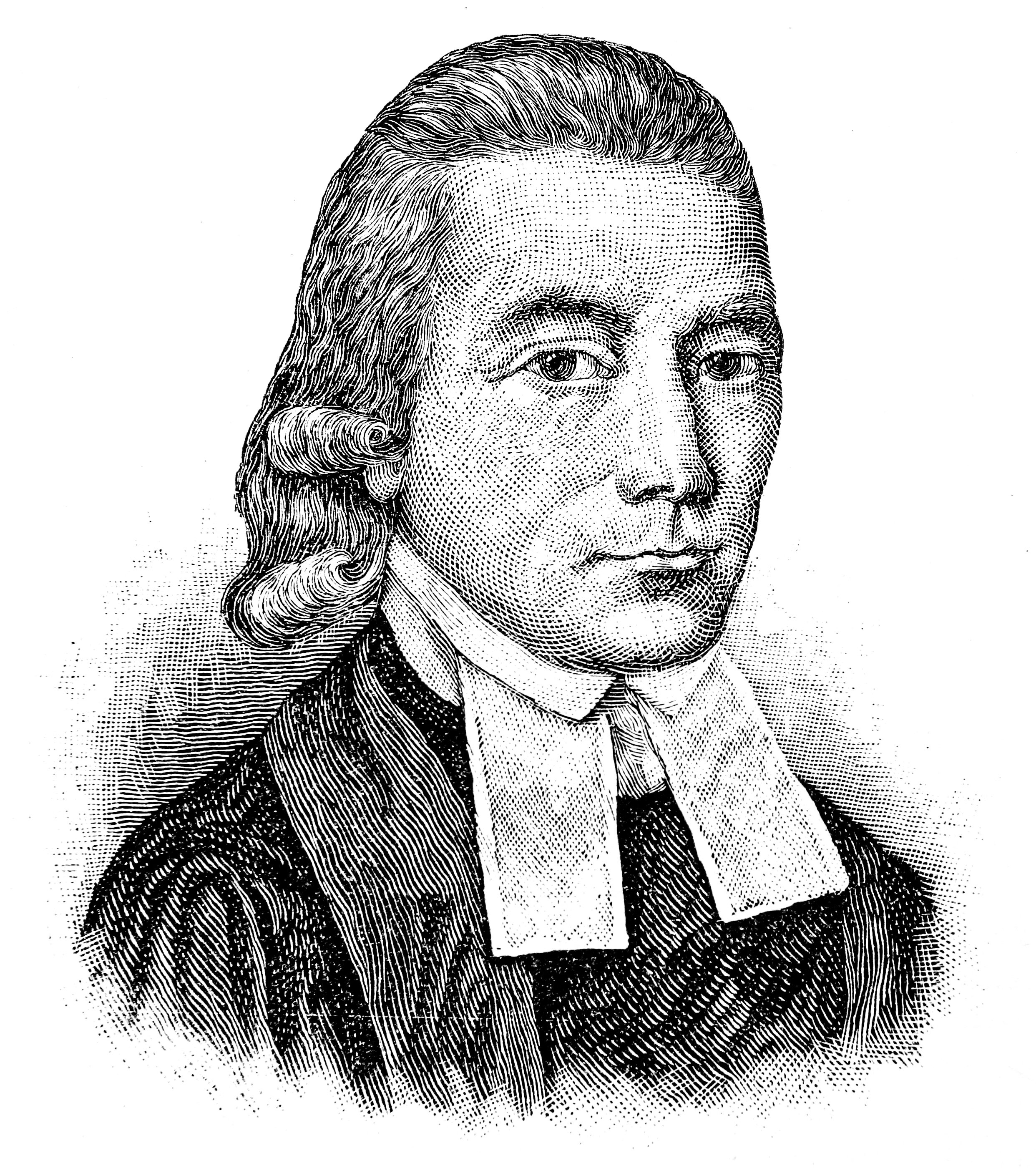
- Church: Episcopal Church
- Diocese: Massachusetts
- Elected: 1804
- In office: 1804
- Predecessor: Edward Bass
- Successor: Alexander Viets Griswold

Orders
- Ordination: February 27, 1774 by Richard Terrick
- Consecration: September 14, 1804 by William White

Personal details
- Born: August 17, 1744 Portsmouth, New Hampshire, Province of New Hampshire
- Died: December 6, 1804 (aged 60) Boston, Massachusetts, United States
- Denomination: Anglican
- Parents: William Parker; Elizabeth Parker
- Spouse: Anne Parker
- Children: 15
- Occupation: Episcopal bishop
- Education: Harvard

Samuel Parker (August 17, 1744 – December 6, 1804) was an American Episcopal Bishop. He was the second bishop of the Episcopal Diocese of Massachusetts.

== Education and Ordination ==
Parker was born in Portsmouth, New Hampshire, the son of William Parker, a lawyer and judge during the American Revolution. He graduated from Harvard University in 1764, and taught for several years.

After being offered a job as assistant rector of Trinity Church, Boston, Parker was ordained deacon on February 24, 1774 and priest three days later on February 27, in London. He began as assistant rector at Trinity in November 1774, becoming rector in 1779. After the Revolution, he helped build churches with the Society for the Propagation of the Gospel.

In 1803, Parker was unanimously elected second bishop of Massachusetts. He was consecrated September 14, 1804, in Trinity Church, New York, but developed gout and never served in the post. He died in Boston on December 6, 1804.

=== Consecrators ===
- William White, 1st bishop of Pennsylvania and 1st and 4th Presiding Bishop
- Thomas John Claggett, 1st bishop of Maryland
- Abraham Jarvis, 2nd bishop of Connecticut

Parker was the tenth bishop consecrated in the Episcopal Church.

== Publications ==
- Annual Election Sermon before the Legislature of Massachusetts (1793)
- Sermon for the Benefit of the Boston Female Asylum (1803)

== Family life ==
Parker's sons included Suffolk County district attorney Samuel Dunn Parker, acting Mayor of Boston William Parker, businessman John Rowe Parker, and educator Richard Green Parker.

Episcopal Church (USA) titles
Preceded by Edward Bass	Bishop of Massachusetts; 1804	Succeeded by Alexander Viets Griswold
