= George Loring Brown =

American painter (1814–1889)

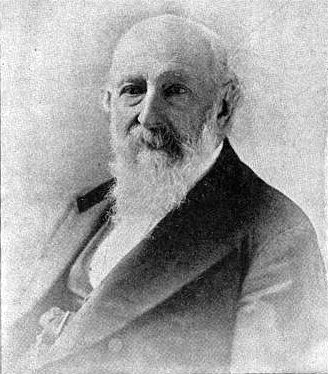
Portrait of George L. Brown

George Loring Brown (February 2, 1814 – June 25, 1889) was an American landscape painter. He was born in Boston and first studied wood engraving under Alonzo Hartwell and worked as an illustrator. He studied painting with Washington Allston, but soon went to Europe, residing principally in Italy for years. Brown spent much of his life abroad, and the motives of his pictures are usually Italian, and there is nothing specifically American about them either in treatment or sentiment. Among the best are Sunset in Genoa (1875), Doges' Palace and Grand Canal, Bay of Naples, Niagara Falls in Moonlight. The Bay of New York (1869) was acquired by King Edward VII when visiting America as Prince of Wales.

Nineteen of his works were exhibited at National Academy of Design and many others were published in The Token and Atlantic Souvenir annual gift book in the late 1830s. Among them was The Panther Scene, which was inspired by James Fenimore Cooper's novel The Pioneers and published in The Token in 1836. According to historian David S. Lovejoy, Brown's paintings were less famous but more inspiring than others published in the annual.

== Image gallery ==
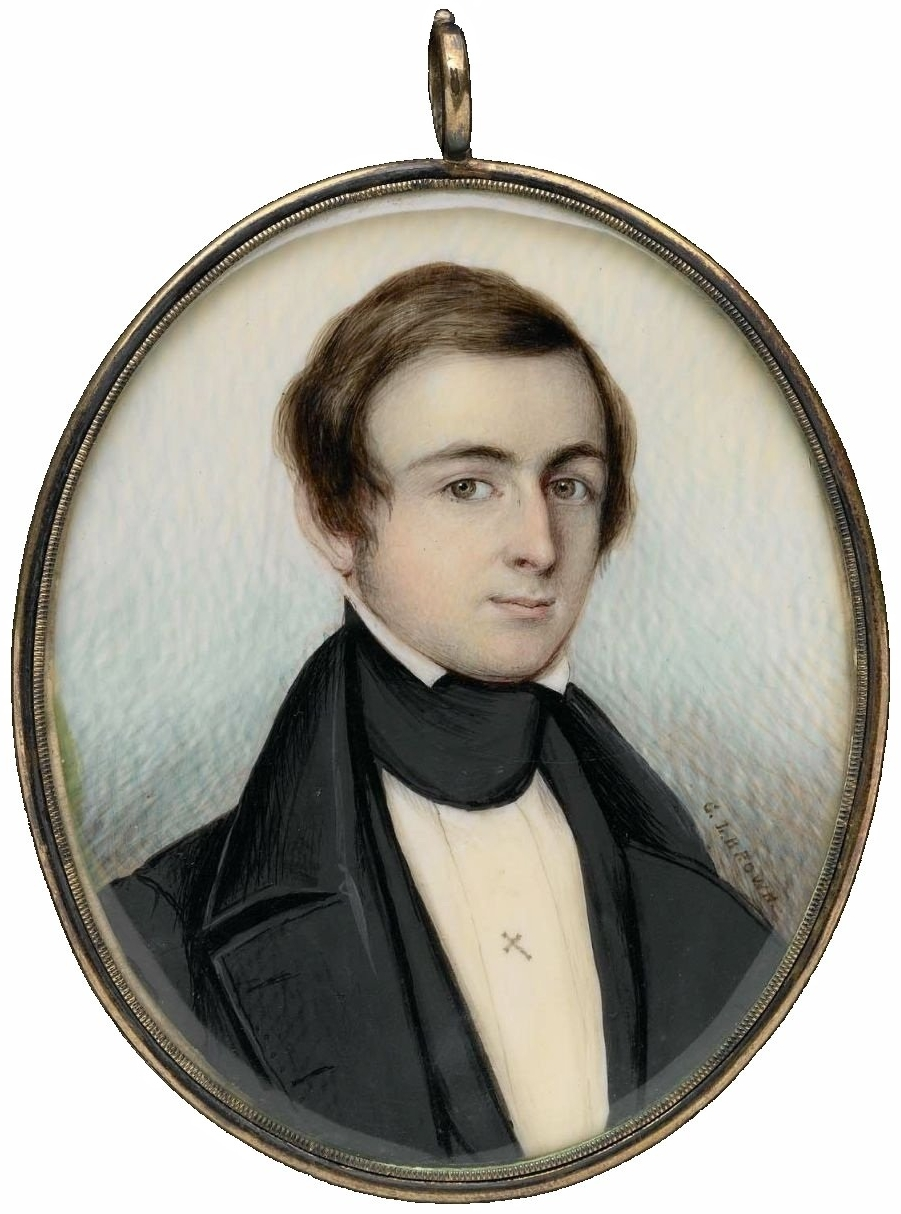
Portrait of Joshua Richardson Bigelow, 1839

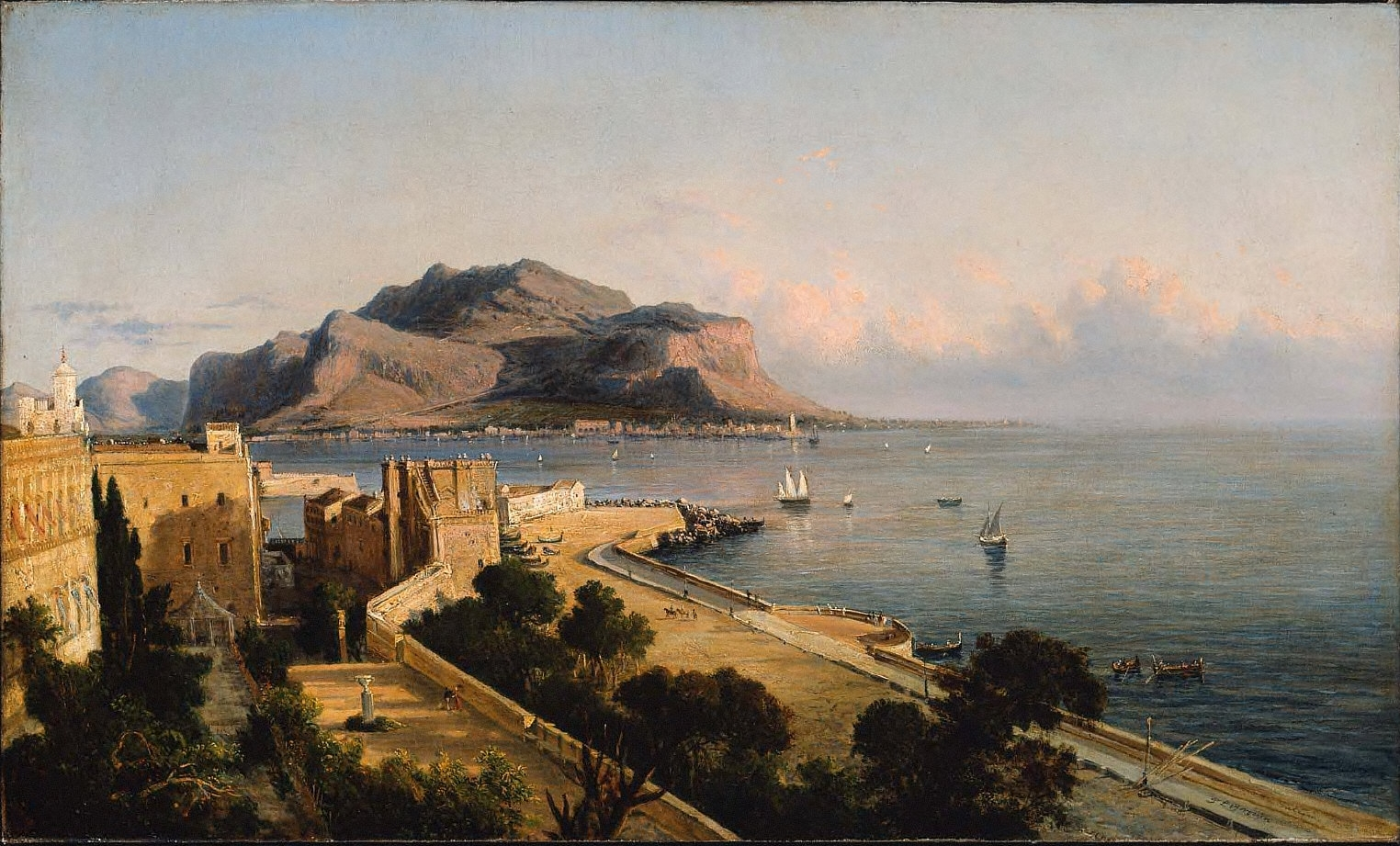
Monte Pellegrino at Palermo, Italy, 1856.

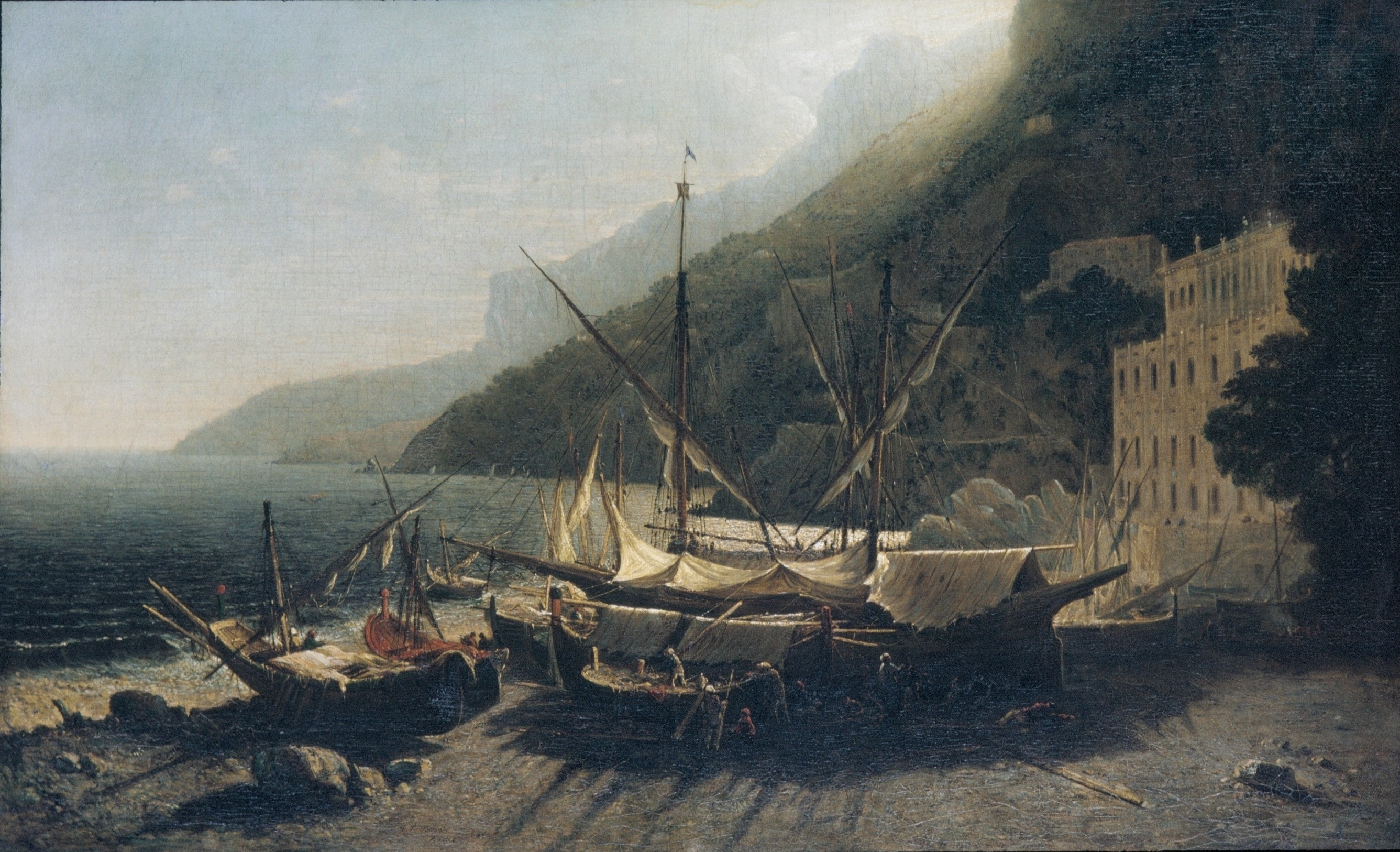
View at Amalfi, Bay of Salerno, 1857

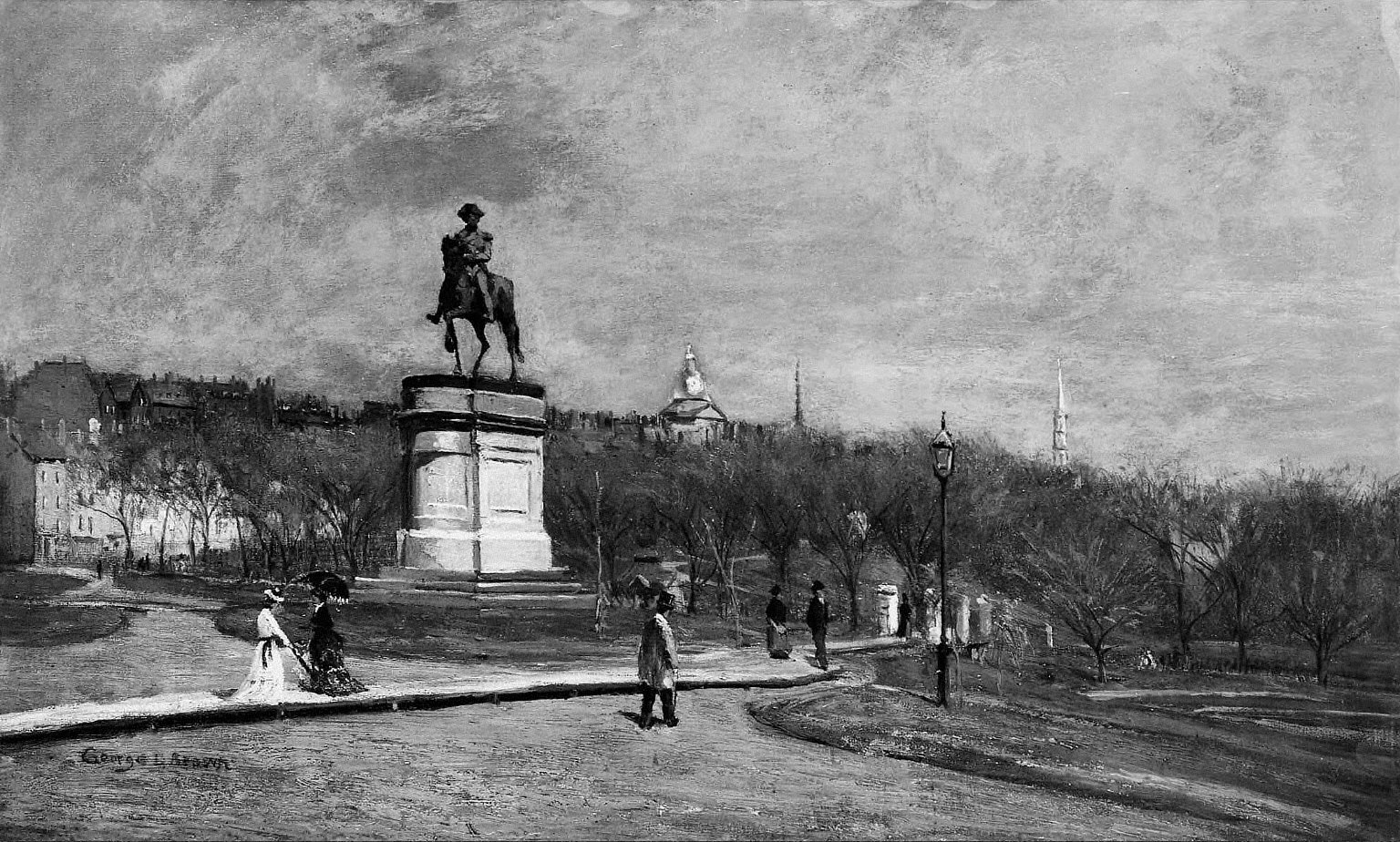
Public Garden, Boston, ca.1869 or after
