= Boston Weekly Magazine =

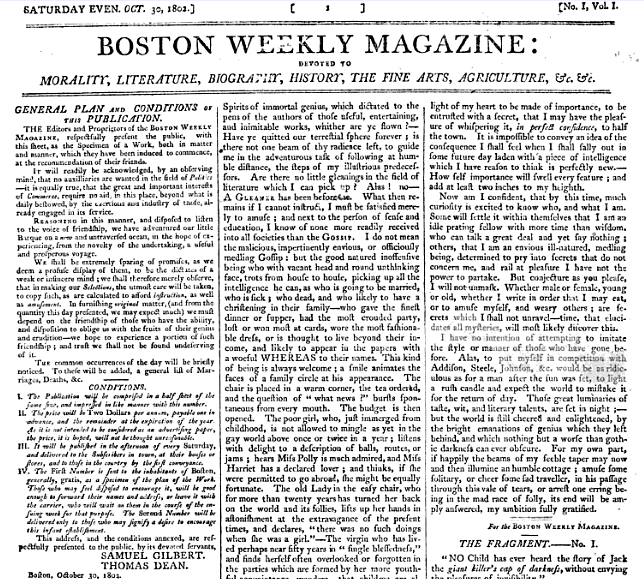
Boston Weekly Magazine no.1, October 30, 1802

The Boston Weekly Magazine (1802–1808) of Boston, Massachusetts, was established by Gilbert & Dean in 1802, "devoted to morality, literature, biography, history, the fine arts, agriculture, &c. &c.". Joshua Belcher, Samuel T. Armstrong, Oliver C. Greenleaf, and Susanna Rowson were also affiliated with its production. The magazine ceased in 1808. The magazine was later published under the same name by David H. Ela and John B. Hall in 1840–41.
