= Gilbert & Dean =

Gilbert & Dean (1802–1823) was a banking and publishing firm in Boston, Massachusetts, run by Samuel Gilbert and Thomas Dean in the early 19th-century. As publishers, they produced works by Joseph Croswell, David Humphreys, Susanna Rowson, John Sylvester John Gardiner, Benjamin Dearborn and others, as well as the Boston Weekly Magazine. They kept an office on State Street.

== History ==
Samuel Gilbert (1777-ca.1867) and Thomas Dean (1779–1826) established their partnership in 1802. Both Dean and Gilbert had trained with Boston newspaperman Benjamin Russell, of the Columbian Centinel.

In 1802, they began publishing the Boston Weekly Magazine. Susanna Rowson served as editor, and also contributed serialised fiction and other pieces. "As an early attempt to describe the manners, reprehend the follies, cultivate the taste and soften the customs of the people, the Boston Weekly Magazine is not discreditable to American literature." The magazine ceased in 1805. Besides the weekly, the firm published numerous other titles. They kept an office at "no. 56, State-street, Boston, where printing in all its branches, is executed with neatness, accuracy and dispatch;" by 1804, they'd moved to "no.78, State-Street, corner of Wilson's Lane."

Meanwhile, in addition to printing, the firm's business also encompassed banking. Gilbert & Dean described themselves as "lottery, stock and exchange brokers." Among other activities, they notified the public of counterfeit currency, describing details by which people might recognize forgeries. One notorious counterfeiter, Stephen Burroughs, mocked Gilbert & Dean's anti-counterfeit efforts:

"Gentleman, Having often seen your 'only sure guide to bank bills,' and admiring your kind labors for the public weal, in detecting the works of those 'ingenious rogues,' I have enclosed and forwarded to your Exchange Office, a bill on the Shipton Bank. ... I wish, Gentlemen, you would ... strictly examine all bills on the aforesaid bank, by the enclosed genuine bill; for such is the depravity of man, and such the success of counterfeiting, that I lately observed in one of your newspapers, that patent Buck Wheat Pancakes had been so exactly counterfeited in New-Jersey, that none except the Officers of the Pancake Exchange could distinguish them from the originals!!! -- I solicit your friendship gentlemen, in this important business..."

Gilbert & Dean invested in the gigantic, 7-story, arguably grandiose Exchange Coffee House, built in Boston in 1809. When the Exchange burnt to the ground in 1818, Gilbert & Dean, as major investors, lost thousands of dollars. However the firm regained its momentum, a tribute perhaps to the business skills of Dean and Gilbert. Around 1823 the firm kept its office in the Old State House.

The partnership ended "by mutual consent" in 1823. Gilbert formed a new financial business with his sons Benjamin R. Gilbert and Samuel Gilbert Jr. (1801–1897). Dean also continued in the financial industry.
