= Tufts Children's Hospital =

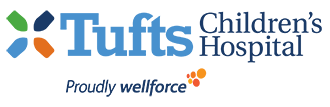

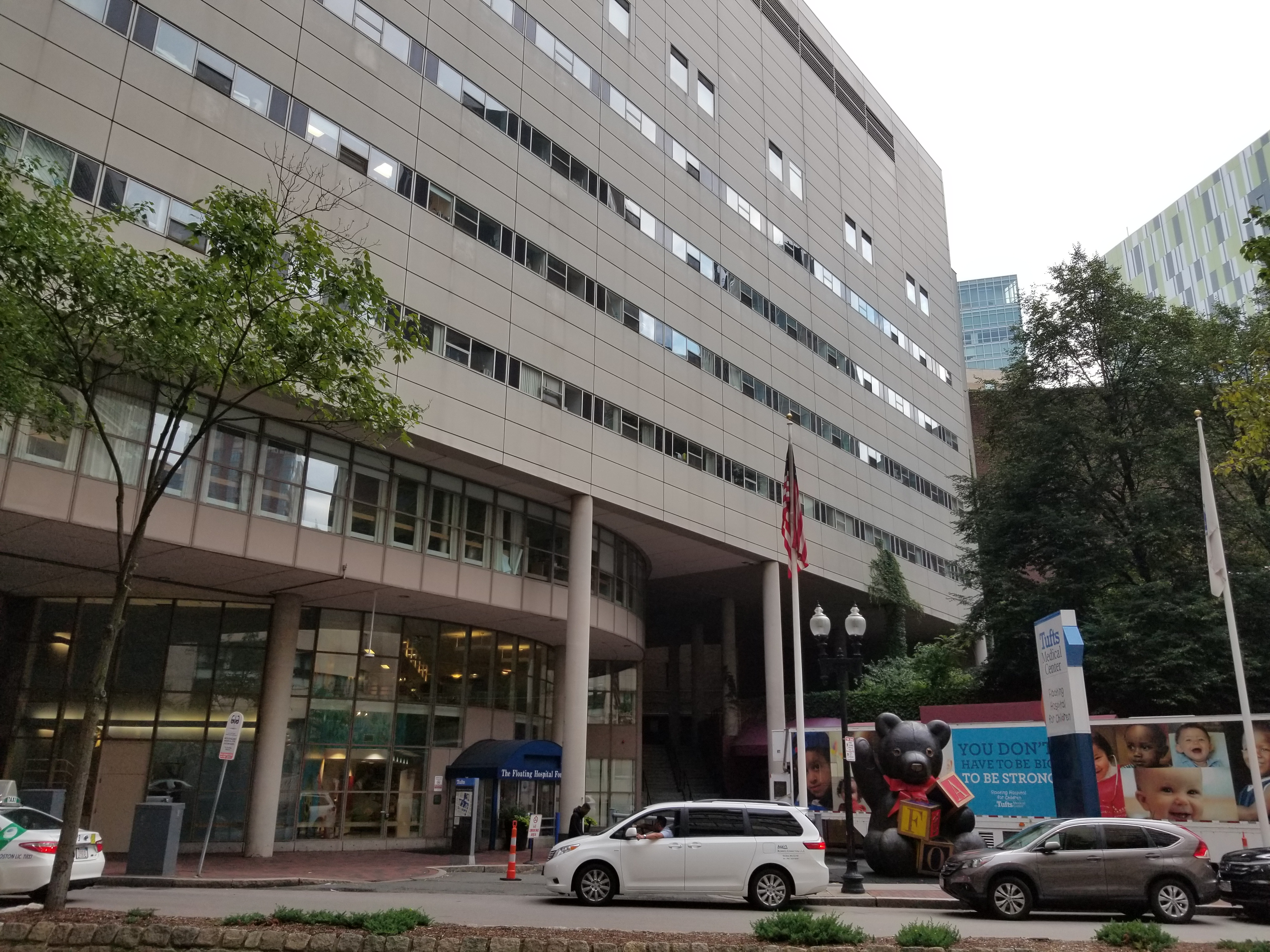

Geography
- Location: 755 Washington Street, Boston, Massachusetts, United States
- Coordinates: 42°21′00″N 71°03′52″W

Organization
- Care system: Nonprofit
- Type: Teaching
- Affiliated university: Tufts University School of Medicine

Services
- Emergency department: Formerly a Level I Pediatric Trauma Center
- Beds: 128
- Speciality: Pediatrics

Helipads
- Helipad: Yes

History
- Founded: 1894
- Closed: 2022

Links
- Website: https://www.tuftschildrenshospital.org/
- Lists: Hospitals in Massachusetts

Tufts Children's Hospital (formerly Floating Hospital for Children) in Boston, Massachusetts was a downtown Boston pediatric hospital owned by Tufts Medical Center, occupying the space between Chinatown and the Boston Theater District, which closed in summer 2022.

In January 2022, Tufts announced they would be closing their 41-bed pediatric hospital later in 2022 but will keep their NICU open. It closed in June 2022.

The 41-bed children's hospital offered pediatric inpatient and outpatient services in every medical and surgical specialty. Tufts Children's Hospital was also the principal pediatric teaching hospital for Tufts University School of Medicine, where all full-time physicians held faculty appointments.

Tufts Children's Hospital was a member of Tufts Medicine and has affiliations with hospitals in the community, including Lawrence General Hospital, Lowell General Hospital, MetroWest Medical Center, Signature Healthcare Brockton Hospital and Cape Cod Hospital. Tufts Children's Hospital had Specialty Centers in Woburn, Chelmsford, Westford and Lawrence provided sub-specialist care for children on an outpatient basis. Along with the New England Quality Care Alliance (NEQCA), a 1,600-physician network, who provide care to patients throughout eastern Massachusetts. NEQCA's primary care physicians care for more than 550,000 patients. Some ambulatory sub-specialty centers remained open after the main hospital’s closure.

== History ==
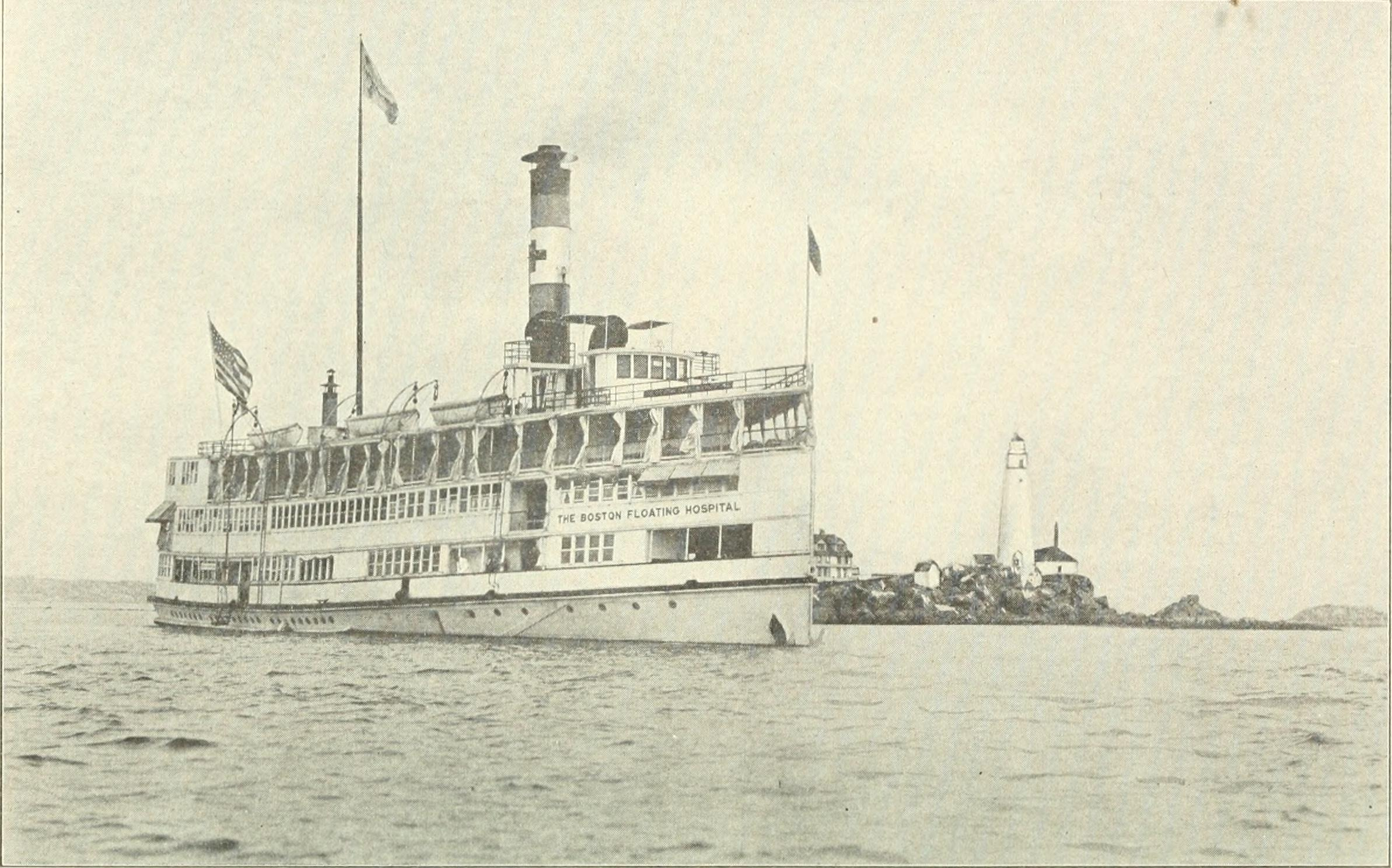
The Harvard medical school and its clinical opportunities (1916) (14777891004)

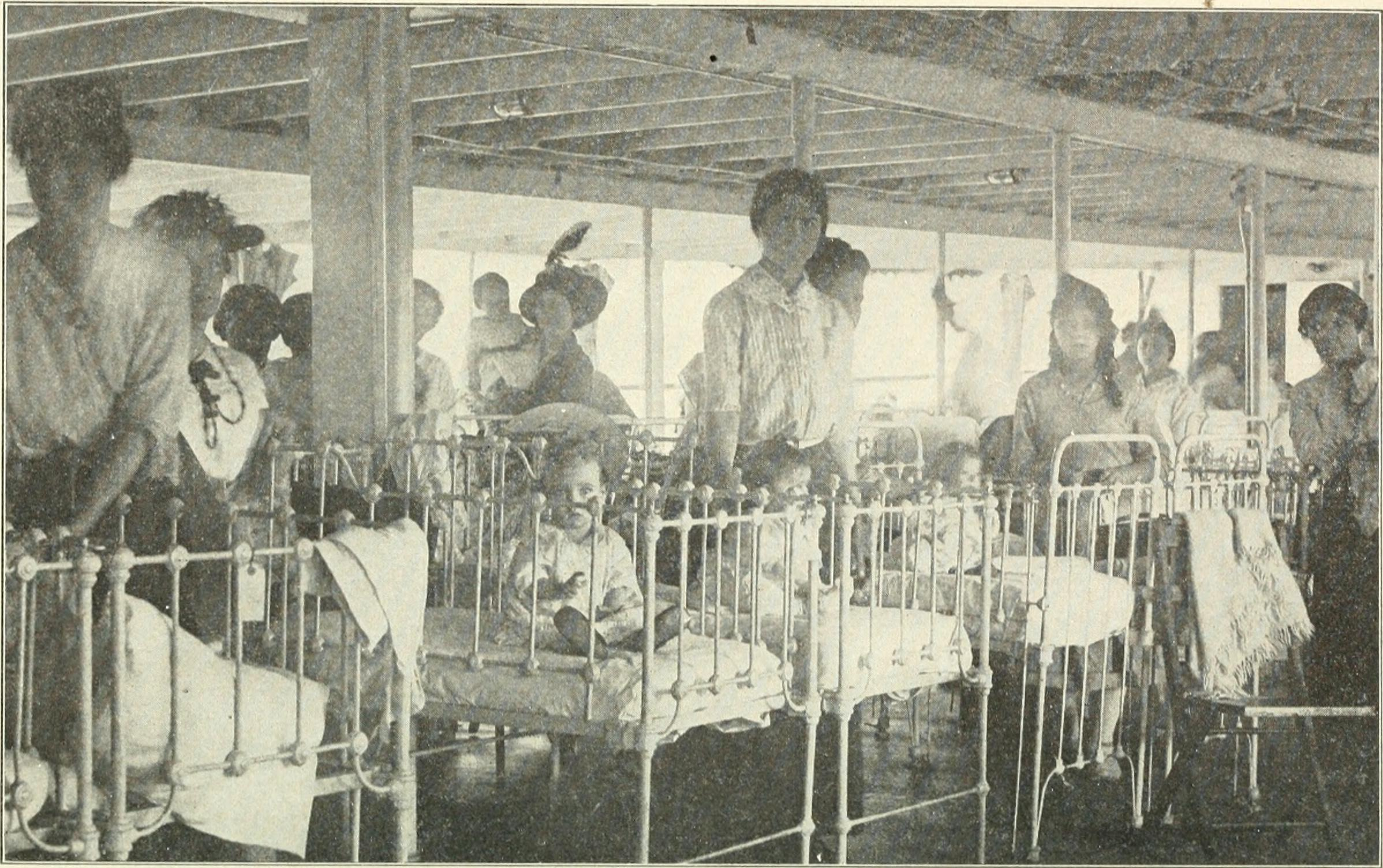
The Harvard medical school and its clinical opportunities (1916) (14777893714)

Floating Hospital for Children began as a hospital ship sailing the Boston Harbor for the first time in 1894. The hospital was founded by Rufus Tobey, a Congregationalist minister; and The Rev. Edward Everett Hale, a minister and social activist. Boston's Lend A Hand Society, founded by Hale, assisted with fundraising and administrative support. For a time, the boat was also used for parties on Boston harbor, with the leisure cruise ending at midnight and hospital services opening at 8am. Heralded as a major innovation in pediatric medicine, the mission of the hospital ship was to take ill urban children out onto the harbor to experience the healing qualities of fresh sea air and sunshine. By the end of the first summer, 1,100 children were treated. For 33 years, Floating Hospital for Children was located on two successive vessels helping children and educating mothers about dysentery and other important health issues. Furthermore, two major advancements made on board were the development of a human milk bank to supply breast milk to sick infants, and the creation of the first effective synthetic milk product for infants (infant formula), still sold worldwide today as Similac. The Floating Hospital claims to be the first with air conditioning in 1906, though the Royal Victoria Hospital, Belfast claims to be the world's first air-conditioned public building.

In 1927 the Floating Hospital ship was destroyed by fire, and an on-shore facility was created for research and some clinical specialties. It also began an affiliation with Tufts University School of Medicine and Tufts Medical Center's predecessor, the Boston Dispensary. Floating Hospital for Children officially merged with Tufts Medical Center in 1965, but retained its name until it became Tufts Children's Hospital in 2020.

In January 2022, Tufts announced they would be closing their 41-bed pediatric hospital as of July 2022 but will keep their NICU open. This closure will allow the hospital to expand the treatment of adult patients. Tufts will now refer pediatric patients to Boston Children’s Hospital.

== Emergency Medicine ==
Tufts Medical Center, formally Tufts Children's Hospital is home to the Kiwanis Pediatric Trauma Institute (the oldest pediatric trauma center in the country).

== Transportation ==
The Tufts Medical Center MBTA Station is on the MBTA Orange Line and there is a connecting Silver Line stop beneath the overpass connecting the main atrium with Tufts Children's Hospital. Also within a short walking distance is South Station, a major transportation hub serving the MBTA Commuter Rail, MBTA Red Line, Greyhound Lines, Amtrak, and several Chinatown buses with links to New York City.
