= Tufts Medical Center =

- Tufts Medicine
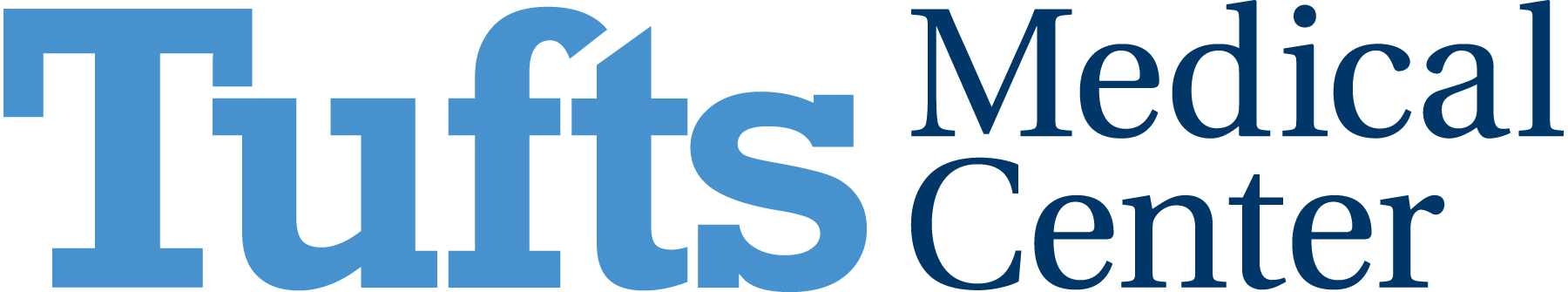

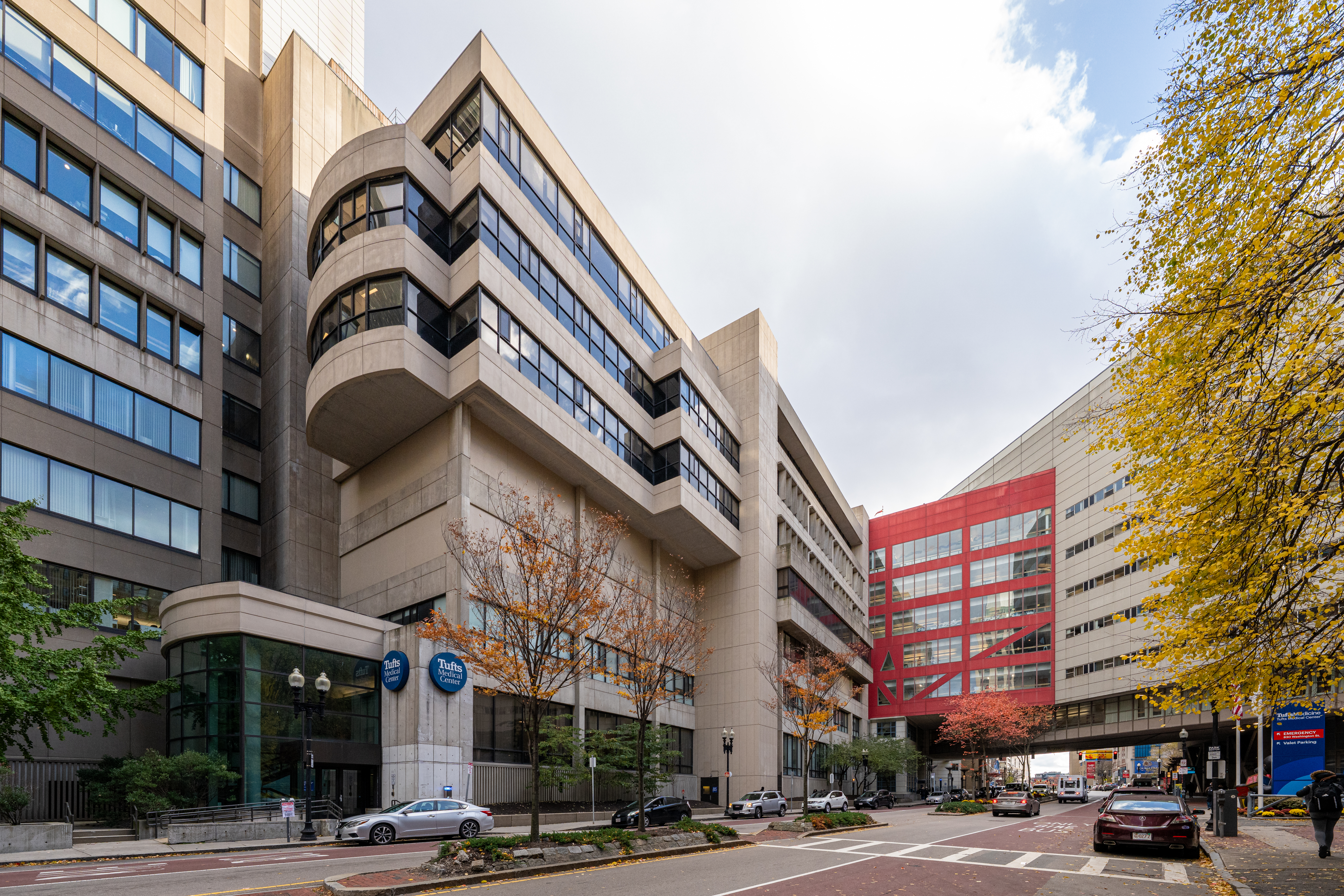

Geography
- Location: Boston, Massachusetts, United States
- Coordinates: 42.34951°N 71.06331°W

Organization
- Care system: Private
- Type: Teaching
- Affiliated university: Tufts University School of Medicine

Services
- Emergency department: Level I trauma center
- Beds: 415

Helipads
- Helipad: FAA LID: MA66
Number	Length		Surface
Number	ft	m	Surface
H1	44	14	Rooftop, aluminum

History
- Founded: 1796 (as Boston Dispensary)

Links
- Website: www.tuftsmedicine.org/get-care/our-locations/about-tufts-medical-center
- Lists: Hospitals in Massachusetts

Tufts Medical Center (until 2008 Tufts-New England Medical Center), a 15-building campus located in Boston, Massachusetts, is a downtown Boston hospital midway between Chinatown and the Boston Theater District.

The hospital is a community-based full service medical center. It is also the principal teaching hospital for Tufts University School of Medicine and the Tufts University School of Dental Medicine, where all full-time Tufts physicians hold faculty appointments. Tufts Medical Center was formerly subdivided into a full-service adult hospital and the Tufts Children's Hospital, the latter of which closed in 2022.

The hospital is an integrated part of Tufts Medicine, which also includes Lowell General Hospital, MelroseWakefield Hospital, Lawrence Memorial Hospital of Medford (part of MelroseWakefield), home health services, and physician networks.

Tufts Medical Center's Interim President is Phil Okala. Tufts Medical Center also has satellite locations in the suburbs of Quincy, Chelmsford, Framingham, among others. It is also a major center for bio-medical research.

== History ==
=== Floating hospital ===
Tufts Medical Center's origins date back to 1796 when the Boston Dispensary was established as the first permanent medical facility in New England and one of the first in the United States. Modeled after a similar dispensary in London, the Boston Dispensary's mission was to provide subscription based, free medical care to the city's "worthy poor" in their homes. Early donors included Samuel Adams and Paul Revere.

In 1894, the Boston Floating Hospital for Children was established by Rev. Rufus Tobey. The first ship, the Clifford, was lost in a fire on June 1, 1927. After this, the floating hospital relocated to shore and became a permanent part of the Tufts Medical Center campus.

At the time there was little medical help for the many, often fatal, childhood illness that befell infants and small children. Because many people believed in the cleansing and therapeutic qualities of sea air to improve health, Tobey thought that sending the sick children out onto Boston Harbor on a boat and having them be seen by a doctor would be very beneficial. The enterprise was successful from the start and for the next 33 years, two successive ships were home to the hospital for children in Boston Harbor. In 1931, after the second Floating Hospital ship was destroyed in a fire, the hospital was relocated to two successive buildings onshore.

The hospital's name has evolved over the years. The well known name of New England Medical Center was established in 1930 as a result of a union of the Boston Dispensary, the Boston Floating Hospital for Children and the Pratt Diagnostic Clinic. Tufts University School of Medicine joined as an affiliate. In 1968 it was renamed Tufts-New England Medical Center (Tufts-NEMC) to reflect the growing relationship between the hospital and the medical school. The affiliation agreement they adopted still stands. The name was shortened to Tufts Medical Center on March 4, 2008.

=== Recent ===
Ellen Zane retired as president and CEO of Tufts Medical Center in 2011. In 2011, a nurses strike was averted after nurses and administrators reached an agreement hours before the strike time. After a five-day walkout that turned into a lockout, on July 17, 2017, nurses returned to Tufts Medical Center, which ended the first nursing strike in Boston in 30 years. According to the Boston Globe, several complaints of sub-standard care submitted to the Massachusetts Department of Public Health (DPH), were being investigated. It was also the largest nurses' strike in the state's history, with 1,200 nursing staff joining to protest staffing, wages, and retirement plans.

In 2018, the center completed its 500th heart transplant, and since 2000, had performed the most in the New England area. In 2018, Deeb Salem was co-interim CEO at the hospital. In the fall of 2018, Michael Apkon was named CEO of Tufts Medical Center.

Tufts Medical became a leader in heart transplants in 2016, and in October 2024 performed its 800th heart transplant. In December 2022, they announced the relaunch of its liver transplant program which closed in 2007. The program is housed within the Abdominal Transplant Institute, and opened in 2023.

In January 2022, CEO Mike Tarnoff, MD announced that Tufts Medical Center closed the doors of its pediatric hospital after being open for 128 years. The hospital's 41 pediatric beds were converted into adult ICU and medical/surgical beds and pediatric patients were sent to Boston Children's Hospital beginning in July. Tufts nurses protested the closure.

In November 2022, Diana Richardson succeeded Mike Tarnoff as president of Tufts Medical Center, with Tarnoff remaining CEO. In early 2023, Tufts Medicine operated Tufts Medical Center, MelroseWakefield Healthcare, Lowell General, and Tufts Medicine Care at Home.

In 2023, the center had the largest advanced heart failure program in New England. In October 2024, Tufts Medical Center's heart failure and cardiac transplant team performed the hospital's 800th heart transplant, after it saw its first performed in October 1985.

John Herman became president of Tufts Medical Center in Boston in June 2025.

In a 2025 U.S. News & World Report ranking, the center tied with Newton-Wellesley Hospital for 7th best hospital in the state.

After a $4 million donation from the chair of the Tufts Board of Trustees, Tufts in November 2025 said it would create a Women's Health and Menopause Initiative. In September 2025, Bloomberg reported that Tufts Medical Center and other Massachusetts hospital groups would receive a combined $234 million in state funding.

== Numbers and revenue ==
In the fiscal year 2021, the hospital revenue was $1,371,166 million.

As of 2021, the hospital had a total of 415 licensed beds: 206 medical/surgical beds, 48 adult intensive care beds, 57 pediatric beds, 50 pediatric and neonatal intensive care beds, 34 post-partum beds, 20 adult psychiatric beds, and 24 infant bassinets.

== Research ==
Tufts MC has a history of achievement in scientific research and clinical advances. Of note was Tufts' research that led to the discovery of drugs that prevent the body's rejection of transplanted organs, coining the term "immunosuppression." Research also brought to light the link between obesity and heart disease. Tufts ranks among the top 5 percent of the nation's institutions that receive federal research funds.

== Innovations ==
Tufts Medical Center and its predecessor institutions are responsible for numerous medical innovations, including

- In 1899, the Boston Dispensary established the first U.S. lung clinic.
- In 1918, the Boston Dispensary established a food clinic which was the first of its kind; it is now the Frances Stern Nutrition Center.
- Around 1919, Dr. Alfred Bosworth invented a synthetic milk product for infants, known and sold today as Similac brand of infant formula.
- In 1927, Dr. William Hinton perfected the diagnostic test for syphilis, which is still used today.
- In 1952, the first preparation of human growth hormone was developed.
- In 1958, the suppression of the body's immune system to avoid the rejection of transplanted tissue was demonstrated and the term "Immunosuppression" was coined.
- In 1963, the Family Participation Unit was established, allowing parents to stay in the hospital overnight with their children.
- In 1981, the world's first pediatric trauma center was established.
- In 1997, the Neely House was established as a first-of-its-kind bed and breakfast-style home within the walls of the hospital. The facility hosts the families of adult and pediatric cancer patients.
- In 2001, the first-in-the-nation transplant exchange program, "Hope Through Sharing" was established.

== Emergency medicine ==
The Emergency Department is equipped for the evaluation, resuscitation and stabilization of patients of all ages who present with acute illness or injury. The Tufts Children's Hospital is the home of the Kiwanis Pediatric Trauma Institute and is a Level I Pediatric Trauma Center (the oldest pediatric trauma center in the country). The hospital has been verified by the American College of Surgeons as a Level I trauma center since 2012, one of 5 Boston adult trauma centers. Tufts Medical Center is part of the consortium of hospitals which operates Boston MedFlight, and is equipped with a rooftop helipad.

== Transportation ==
Tufts Medical Center is located in Boston's Chinatown, near many highways including Interstates 90 and 93. The Tufts Medical Center MBTA Station is on the MBTA Orange Line and there is a connecting Silver Line stop beneath the overpass connecting the main atrium with Floating Hospital for Children. Also within a short walking distance is Boylston station on the Green Line and South Station, a major transportation hub serving the MBTA Commuter Rail, MBTA Red Line, Greyhound Lines, Amtrak, and several Chinatown buses with links to New York City.

In 2014, an article in The Tufts Daily asserted that "Boston Chinatown’s gentrification [is] linked historically to Tufts Medical Center’s expansion."

== See also ==
- List of hospitals in Massachusetts
