= American Magazine of Useful and Entertaining Knowledge =

The American Magazine of Useful and Entertaining Knowledge (1834–1837) was a monthly magazine based in Boston, Massachusetts.

It was established by a group of engravers to "give to the public a work descriptive, not merely of subjects, scenes, places, and persons existing in distant climes, but also of those which are to be found in our own fine and native country."

It featured profusely illustrated articles on many topics, including American animals, plants, natural scenery, colleges, banks, hospitals, churches, cities, technology, and so on; as well as biographical articles on figureheads of the revolutionary and federal eras.

Modelled after the British Penny Magazine, it was published first by the Boston Bewick Company, then by William D. Ticknor and John L. Sibley. Starting in January of 1836, Nathaniel Hawthorne served as editor, and also as the magazine's sole contributor. Some of his articles were original; others were collected from other magazines or books. He resigned less than a year later because the workload was too demanding and the pay too low.
