= Explore: The Journal of Science & Healing =

- Discipline: Alternative medicine, parapsychology, faith healing, health care, spirituality
- Language: English
- Edited by: Larry Dossey

Publication details
- History: 2005–present
- Publisher: Elsevier
- Frequency: Bimonthly
- Impact factor: 2.4 (2025)

Standard abbreviations
- ISO 4: Explore (NY)

Indexing
- ISSN: 1550-8307 (print); 1878-7541 (web)
- LCCN: 2004215412
- OCLC no.: 55647196

Links
- Journal page at Elsevier

Explore: The Journal of Science & Healing is an interdisciplinary journal that publishes papers on alternative medicine six times per year. It was established in 2005 and is published by Elsevier. The executive editor is faith healing advocate Larry Dossey, and the co-editors-in-chief are hypnotherapist, acupuncturist, and herbalist Benjamin Kligler, an associate professor at the Albert Einstein College of Medicine, and parapsychologist Dean Radin. The journal has been described as a "sham masquerading as a real scientific journal" which publishes "truly ridiculous studies", such as Masaru Emoto's claimed demonstration of the effect of "distant intention" on water crystal formation.

== Journal content ==
The journal describes itself as addressing "the scientific principles behind, and applications of, evidence-based healing practices from a wide variety of sources, including conventional, alternative, and cross-cultural medicine." According to the information for authors, papers "most likely to be published are those that present important new ideas and information on the healing arts, consciousness, spirituality, eco-environmental issues, and basic science as all these fields relate to health" as well as those on "new perspectives on the integration of complementary and alternative therapies". Explore was started in 2005 and is published by medical and scientific journal publisher Elsevier.

Explore has been heavily criticized both for the content it publishes and the beliefs of its editorial team. Its self-description and author information explicitly includes pseudoscientific topics well outside the mainstream of medical practice. Critics have noted this willingness to publish work in areas lacking a scientific basis, and have labelled it a "quack journal" which "doesn't limit itself to just one quackery, the way [the journal] Homeopathy does", a publisher of "truly ridiculous studies", and as a "sham masquerading as a real scientific journal".

=== Individual papers ===
==== Whole systems complementary and alternative medicine ====
In a discussion of publications coming from two NIH-funded studies undertaken by homeopathy proponent Iris Bell (a member of the editorial board of Explore), David Gorski examined several publications from this research, including the Explore-published paper on whole systems complementary and alternative medicine using complex systems theory. This was an observational study which divided subjects into "flourishers" and "languishers", and was "not very interesting", according to Gorski.

==== Distant intention ====
Dean Radin, the journal's co-editor-in-chief, published a paper in Explore on the effect on mood of eating chocolate which had been imbued with positive intent; the paper was included in a Time magazine discussion that also explored Masaru Emoto's claims of imbuing water with positive intent. Gorski criticized the study design and analysis and noted that Radin offers an explanation of results in terms of quantum mechanics and the observer effect which reflects a well-known misconception about the effect. Emoto's work in this area has been extensively criticized, including in New Scientist the Skeptical Inquirer, and Spirituality & Health magazine.

In 2006 Radin and Emoto published a follow-up of these studies focused on "distant intention" on water crystal formation in Explore and another in the Journal of Scientific Exploration; commentary on those papers characterized them as "water woo" and noted that their data did not support their conclusions, and suggested that perhaps "Emoto is an evangelist who values the message of his images more than the particulars of science."

==== Chico Xavier letters ====
In 2015 a paper about truthfulness of mediumship obtained automatic writing letters by the Brazilian spiritist medium Chico Xavier. Partially funded by FAPESP, the paper was criticized by skeptics and citizen science journalists. Carlos Orsi, in Galileu magazine. Maurício Tuffani, in the newspaper Folha de S.Paulo, questioned the credibility of results and conclusions presented, especially the methodological flaws of the publication. They also criticized the article because of the low impact factor of Explore magazine. Tuffani published a response from the parapsychologist Alexander Moreira-Almeida, one of the authors of the article, but retained previous criticisms.

== Editorial team ==
The executive editor of Explore is Larry Dossey, an advocate for faith healing and other alternative medicine approaches that have no grounding in science. The co-editors-in-chief are Benjamin Kligler, who practices Ericksonian hypnotherapy, acupuncture, and herbalism, and parapsychologist Dean Radin, who has been described by Steven Novella as having a "dedicated ideology and a poor history" and a "reputation for creatively massaging data." Radin is the chief scientist of the Institute of Noetic Sciences which explores purported phenomena which "do not necessarily fit conventional scientific models." He also works with the Parapsychological Association which describes itself as "a professional organization ... engaged in the study of psi (or 'psychic') experiences, such as telepathy, clairvoyance, psychokinesis, psychic healing, and precognition."

Sadri Hassani, a retired professor of physics who maintains the website Skeptical Educator, said of the journal "The editorial board of Explore says it all! ... When the executive editor himself publishes books on 'knowing the future' and the 'healing power of prayer;' and when coeditors-in-chief engage in the exploration of phenomena that do not necessarily fit conventional scientific models and do research on telepathy and psychic healing, what is the purpose of 'peer-review?'".

== Impact ==
According to the Journal Citation Reports, in 2025 the journal had an impact factor of 2.4.
