= Raymond Chang (physician) =

American physician

Raymond Y. Chang M.D., FACP
- Born: 1957 (age 68–69)
- Education: Brown University; Warren Alpert Medical School
- Known for: Integrative oncology, Drug repurposing in cancer treatment
- Scientific career
- Fields: Internal medicine, Integrative oncology
- Workplaces: Memorial Sloan Kettering Cancer Center; Weill Cornell Medical College; NewYork–Presbyterian Hospital
- Website: www.meridianmedical.org

Raymond Chang (born 1957), is an American physician specializing in integrative oncology. His research examines the use of Chinese herbs and repurposing of common drugs for cancer treatment and the integration of Western and Eastern medical practices.

== Early life and education ==
Chang was born in Hong Kong and later moved to the United States. He earned a Bachelor of Arts degree, magna cum laude, from Brown University, where he was elected to Phi Beta Kappa and Sigma Xi. He received his Doctor of Medicine from the Warren Alpert Medical School of Brown University. He completed his residency at Waterbury Hospital, affiliated with Yale University, and was a Kaiser Fellow at NewYork–Presbyterian Hospital/Weill Cornell Medical Center.

== Career ==
From 1987 to 1997, Chang was affiliated with Memorial Sloan Kettering Cancer Center. He served on the faculty of Weill Cornell Medical College from 1987 to 2014 and as an attending physician at NewYork–Presbyterian Hospital from 1997 to 2014.

In 1997, Chang founded the Institute of East–West Medicine, a non-profit organization focused on integration of Western medicine and Asian healing traditions. He later established the Meridian Medical Group in New York City, which provides combined conventional and alternative treatments. In 2001, Chang chaired the First International Conference on Asian Therapies for Cancer in New York.

Chang has been a member of the American Society of Clinical Oncology, the European Society for Medical Oncology, the Royal Society of Medicine, the European Society for Hyperthermic Oncology, and the American Society of Medical Acupuncture. He has served on editorial boards of Complementary and Alternative Medicine and Integrative Cancer Therapies, and on advisory boards for the National Cancer Institute's PDQ database and the Continuum Center for Health and Healing at Beth Israel Hospital in New York.

== Research contributions ==
Chang has authored over 70 academic papers with over 1000 citations. His research examines combination treatment strategies and drug repurposing for cancer and COVID-19, the integration of Eastern and Western medicine in oncology and immunology, the use of medicinal mushrooms and Chinese herbs in oncology, and the use of acupuncture in infertility. Since 2004, he collaborated with Dr. Thomas Nesselhut and Professor Fred Fändrich and published on dendritic cell vaccine research for cancer.

He has proposed a "cocktail approach" to cancer treatment in 2008, advocating the use of multiple therapeutic agents and modalities simultaneously in combination, which he outlined in his 2011 book Beyond the Magic Bullet: The Anti-Cancer Cocktail. As part of a cocktail approach would be the use of repurposed drugs and Chang suggested that anti-parasitics such as anti-malarials could be a source of anti-cancer drugs. He also reviewed the use of Chinese herbs with chemotherapy for cancer and the use of metformin as an anticancer treatment.

Chang is a licensed acupuncturist and published on acupuncture in reproductive medicine, including its application during in vitro fertilization (IVF). A 2003 review in Fertility and Sterility summarized possible effects of acupuncture on uterine blood flow, hormone regulation, and stress reduction.

In 2022, Chang co-authored studies on the repositioning of chloroquine and hydroxychloroquine as potential prophylactic agents against SARS-CoV-2 and was one of the first to advocate the use of lactoferrin for COVID-19. He has also examined bioactive polysaccharides from traditional Chinese medicine herbs, including medicinal mushrooms, for their immunological effects.

He has evaluated natural products such as mangosteen and soursop, noting that most evidence is limited to in vitro studies without established efficacy in humans.

== Selected publications ==
- McCulloch, Michael; Ly, Helen; Broffman, Michael; See, Caylie; Clemons, Jen; Chang, Raymond (September 2016). "Chinese Herbal Medicine and Fluorouracil-Based Chemotherapy for Colorectal Cancer: A Quality-Adjusted Meta-Analysis of Randomized Controlled Trials". Integrative Cancer Therapies. 15 (3): 285–307. doi:10.1177/1534735416638738. ISSN 1552-695X. PMC 5739191. PMID 27151587.
- Chang, Raymond; Elhusseiny, Khaled Mossad; Yeh, Yu-Chang; Sun, Wei-Zen (2021). "COVID-19 ICU and mechanical ventilation patient characteristics and outcomes-A systematic review and meta-analysis". PLOS ONE. 16 (2) e0246318. Bibcode:2021PLoSO..1646318C. doi:10.1371/journal.pone.0246318. ISSN 1932-6203. PMC 7877631. PMID 33571301.
- Chang, Raymond; Ng, Tzi Bun; Sun, Wei-Zen (September 2020). "Lactoferrin as potential preventative and adjunct treatment for COVID-19". International Journal of Antimicrobial Agents. 56 (3) 106118. doi:10.1016/j.ijantimicag.2020.106118. ISSN 1872-7913. PMC 7390755. PMID 32738305.
- Duffy, Robert; Wade, Christine; Chang, Raymond (September 2012). "Discovery of anticancer drugs from antimalarial natural products: a MEDLINE literature review". Drug Discovery Today. 17 (17–18): 942–953. doi:10.1016/j.drudis.2012.03.013. ISSN 1878-5832. PMID 22504324.
- Nesselhut, J.; Marx, D.; Lorenzen, D.; Cillien, N.; Goebel, W.; Chang, R. Y.; Brockmann, W.; Peters, J. H.; Nesselhut, K.; Fändrich, F.; Nesselhut, T. (2011). "Improvement of dendritic cell therapy in glioblastoma multiforme WHO 4 by Newcastle disease virus". Journal of Clinical Oncology. 29 (15_suppl): 2508. doi:10.1200/jco.2011.29.15_suppl.2508.
- Chang, Raymond (October 2002). "Bioactive polysaccharides from traditional Chinese medicine herbs as anticancer adjuvants". Journal of Alternative and Complementary Medicine. 8 (5): 559–565. doi:10.1089/107555302320825066. ISSN 1075-5535. PMID 12470436.
- Chang, Raymond; Chung, Pak H.; Rosenwaks, Zev (December 2002). "Role of acupuncture in the treatment of female infertility". Fertility and Sterility. 78 (6): 1149–1153. doi:10.1016/s0015-0282(02)04348-0. ISSN 0015-0282. PMID 12477502.
- Chang, Raymond; White, Jeffrey D. (October 2002). "Asian therapies for cancer--coming of age". Journal of Alternative and Complementary Medicine. 8 (5): 541–543. doi:10.1089/107555302320825039. ISSN 1075-5535. PMID 12470433.
- Chang, Raymond (2009). "Functional Properties of Edible Mushrooms". Nutrition Reviews. 54 (11): S91–S93. doi:10.1111/j.1753-4887.1996.tb03825.x. PMID 9110582.

== Books ==
- 醫藥真言 (Taipei, 1996)
- What Your Doctor May Not Tell You About Getting Pregnant: Boost Your Fertility with the Best of Traditional and Alternative Therapies (Grand Central Publishing, 2007)
- Beyond the Magic Bullet: The Anti-Cancer Cocktail (Square One Publishers, 2011)

Chang also authored a chapter on integrative oncology in the textbook Integrative Medicine: Principles for Practice, edited by Benjamin Kligler and Roberta Lee.

== Media ==
In 1999, New York Magazine profiled Chang as one of New York City's "New Healers," describing his integrative approaches to cancer and fertility treatment. He appeared as a commenting physician in the 2015 documentary Surviving Terminal Cancer, discussing the "cocktail approach" to cancer treatment.

Chang has been interviewed by Acupuncture Today and appeared on The Moss Report Podcast in 2021, discussing integrative oncology and drug repurposing. In 2023, he was featured in Kaurspace Magazine regarding alternative cancer therapies.
