= Lixing Lao =

Chinese-American physiologist and acupuncturist

Lixing Lao is a Chinese-American physiologist and acupuncturist. He is known for his research on acupuncture and other forms of traditional Chinese medicine. Since late 2013, he has been the director of the University of Hong Kong's School of Chinese Medicine, He has also held the Vivian Taam Wong Professorship in Integrative Medicine at the University of Hong Kong (HKU) since 2014. He is also an adjunct professor of family and community medicine at the University of Maryland School of Medicine, where he also directs the Traditional Chinese Medicine Research Program in the Center for Integrative Medicine.

== Early life ==
Lao was born in China.

== Education ==
Lao was first trained in acupuncture at the Shanghai University of Traditional Chinese Medicine. He then traveled to the United States to attend the University of Maryland, Baltimore (UMB), where he received his Ph.D. in physiology in 1992.

== Career ==
In 1999, he founded the Traditional Chinese Medicine Research Program at UMB. From 2003 to 2007, he was co-president of the Society for Acupuncture Research. Before joining HKU, he was a full professor at UMB. In 2011, Dr. Lao became the President of Virginia University of Integrative Medicine (VUIM). He retained the role from 2011 to 2013. In 2019, Dr. Lao returned from the University of Hong Kong and became the President of VUIM for the second time. Dr. Lao continues to serve as the President of VUIM today, while also teaching and supervising in the student clinic.

== Research ==
Lao is known for researching acupuncture and other forms of traditional Chinese medicine, such as Chinese herbal medicine. His research on acupuncture is credited with helping persuade the Food and Drug Administration to recognize it as a medical device in 1996.

== Editorial activities ==
Lao is the co-editor-in-chief of the Journal of Integrative Medicine. He also serves on the editorial boards of multiple other journals, including the Journal of Alternative and Complementary Medicine, of which he is an associate editor.
