= Spaulding Rehabilitation Hospital Cape Cod =

- Mass General Brigham

- Location within Massachusetts

Geography
- Location: Sandwich, Barnstable County, Massachusetts, United States
- Coordinates: 41.7329°N 70.4681°W

Organization
- Type: Specialist
- Network: Spaulding Rehabilitation Network

Services
- Standards: Joint Commission
- Emergency department: No
- Beds: 60
- Speciality: Rehabilitation

Links
- Website: http://www.rhci.org
- Lists: Hospitals in Massachusetts

The Spaulding Rehabilitation Hospital Cape Cod (SRHCC) is a rehabilitation hospital located in Sandwich, Massachusetts that serves both Cape Cod and the Islands. It was founded in 1995 and is part of the Spaulding Rehabilitation Network.

It was previously known as the Rehabilitation Hospital of the Cape and Islands (RHCI), and formerly operated under that name. The hospital is owned by Mass General Brigham, a non-profit organization that owns several hospitals in Massachusetts.
