= WDH =

WDH may refer to:

- Hosea Kutako International Airport (IATA: WDH), the main international airport of Namibia
- Wentworth-Douglass Hospital, a not-for-profit acute care hospital in Dover, New Hampshire, United States
- Woodhouse railway station (National Rail station code: WDH), a railway station in Sheffield, South Yorkshire, England
- Wyoming Department of Health, a state agency of Wyoming, United States
