= Vitaly Napadow =

American neuroscientist

- Born: 1971 (age 54–55); Kharkiv, Ukrainian SSR, Soviet Union (now Ukraine)
- Occupations: Neuroscientist, acupuncturist

Vitaly Napadow is an American neuroscientist and acupuncturist. He is a full professor of Physical Medicine & Rehabilitation and Radiology at Harvard Medical School. He is also the Director of the Scott Schoen and Nancy Adams Discovery Center for Recovery from Chronic Pain at Spaulding Rehabilitation Hospital and Director of the Center for Integrative Pain NeuroImaging at the Martinos Center for Biomedical Imaging at Massachusetts General Hospital. He is a former president of the Society for Acupuncture Research. He has been a pain neuroimaging researcher for more than 20 years. Somatosensory, cognitive, and affective factors all influence the malleable experience of chronic pain, and Dr. Napadow's Lab has applied human functional and structural neuroimaging to localize and suggest mechanisms by which different brain circuitries modulate pain perception. Dr. Napadow's neuroimaging research also aims to better understand how non-pharmacological therapies, from acupuncture and transcutaneous neuromodulation to cognitive behavioral therapy and mindfulness meditation training, ameliorate aversive perceptual states such as pain. In fact, his early career was known for researching acupuncture and its effects on the brain. He has also researched the brain circuitry underlying nausea and itch. He is also known for developing a novel approach in applying measures of resting state brain connectivity as potential biomarkers for spontaneous clinical pain in chronic pain disorders such as fibromyalgia.

In 2009, he invented an innovative approach to transcutaneous auricular vagus nerve stimulation (taVNS), wherein stimulation is gated to a specific phase of the respiratory cycle. This form of taVNS, called Respiratory-gated Auricular Vagal Afferent Nerve Stimulation (RAVANS), has been evaluated for pain, depression, hypertension, functional dyspepsia, and other medical disorders.

In 2016, he applied hyperscanning fMRI to evaluate the patient-clinician relationship and how therapeutic alliance and the "art of medicine" impacts clinical outcomes for many different therapies. The first publication came out in 2020, linking brain-to-brain concordance in the temporoparietal junction to anesthesia in chronic pain patients.

== Biography ==
Napadow was born in Kharkiv, Ukraine in 1971 and immigrated to the Baltimore area in the United States as a refugee in 1978. He graduated with a bachelors of science degree in mechanical engineering from Cornell University in 1996, and worked as an intern at the Johnson Space Center, in Clear Lake, TX. He received his master's degree in acupuncture from the New England School of Acupuncture in 2002 and his Ph.D. in biomedical engineering from the Harvard–MIT Program of Health Sciences and Technology in 2001. He joined the faculty of Harvard Medical School in 2004 as an instructor in radiology, where he became an assistant professor of anesthesiology in 2010, an associate professor of radiology in 2014 and a full professor in 2021. In 2021, he also joined Spaulding Rehabilitation Hospital as their Director for Pain Research and serves on the board of the United States Association for the Study of Pain. He has published more than 200 papers in peer-reviewed journals. In 2020 Napadow and his hyperscanning research was featured in a special issue on Pain in the National Geographic.
