= Salem Hospital =

Salem Hospital may refer to:

- Salem Hospital (Massachusetts)
- Salem Hospital (Oregon)
