= Andrew C. Hecht =

American orthopaedic surgeon

- Born: May 11, 1967; New York City
- Education: Brown University, Harvard Medical School
- Scientific career
- Fields: Orthopedic surgery
- Workplaces: The Mount Sinai Hospital

Andrew C. Hecht is an American orthopaedic surgeon and a nationally recognized leader in surgery on the spine.

Hecht serves as the spine surgical consultant to the New York Jets, the New York Islanders and the New York Dragons, as well as collegiate teams at Hofstra University and Molloy College, and is the Chief of Spine Surgery for the Mount Sinai Health System and Chief of Spine Surgery at The Mount Sinai Hospital, Director of the Mount Sinai Spine Center of Mount Sinai Doctors, the Faculty Practice and associate professor of Orthopaedic Surgery and Neurologic Surgery at the Icahn School of Medicine at Mount Sinai, both in New York City.

Hecht was selected for New York Magazine's “Top Doctors” and as one of Castle Connolly's Top Doctors for the New York Metro Area for Orthopaedic Spine Surgery and Castle Connolly's “Top Doctors in America” for Orthopaedic Spine Surgery. He was elected as “Top Physician” to The New York Times Super Doctors and Best Doctors in America.

Hecht is the author of numerous original peer-reviewed articles, abstracts, invited contributions, multiple books and book chapters and is a contributing author to the Interactive Educational Program for Spine. He recently contributed and edited an issue of Seminars in Spine Surgery dedicated to Spine Injuries in Athletes. He directs the acute spine and spinal cord injury program for the New York Jets and routinely cares for athletes who sustain spine injuries.

== Biography ==
Hecht was born in New York City in 1967. He graduated magna cum laude from Brown University in 1989 and earned his M.D. with magna cum laude honors at Harvard Medical School in 1994. His postdoctoral training includes an internship in general surgery at New England Deaconess Hospital and the Harvard Combined Orthopaedic Surgery Residency Program at Massachusetts General Hospital, Brigham and Women's Hospital and the Beth Israel Deaconess Medical Center, which he completed in 1991. He then completed a fellowship at the Emory University Spine Center.

In 2001, Hecht served as instructor of Orthopaedic Surgery at Harvard Medical School. That same year, Hecht founded the Newton-Wellesley Spine Center and served as it medical co-director. In 2002, he served as Director of the Spine Surgery Fellowship at Massachusetts General Hospital. In 2003, he joined Mount Sinai Medical Center as Chief of Spine Surgery and assistant professor of Orthopaedic Surgery.

Hecht is a member of the North American Spine Society, the Cervical Spine Research Society and the American Academy of Orthopaedic Surgeons and serves on the medical board of trustees at the Musculoskeletal Transplant Foundation. Additionally, he serves on the faculty of numerous courses and meetings to teach spine surgeons the latest clinical advances and surgical techniques. He serves on the editorial board of the Journal of Spinal Disorders and Techniques and sits on the Publications Committee for the American Academy of Orthopaedic Surgeons and founded and directed a course at Mount Sinai Medical Center to educate primary care doctors about musculoskeletal disorders. He lectures nationally and internationally on spine surgery.

Hecht's clinical interests include cervical and lumbar spine surgery, the evaluation and surgical management of degenerative disorders of the cervical, thoracic and lumbar spine, minimally invasive spinal surgery, microsurgery, spine trauma and tumors. Research areas include cervical and lumbar spine surgery and intervertebral disc biology.

== Honors and awards ==
- 2010 Guest Speaker, 10th annual meeting of Advanced Technologies in Spinal Treatment, Tokyo, Japan
- 2010 New York Magazine's Top Doctors
- 2010 Castle Connolly, Top Doctors in America, 9th Edition
- 2009-2015 New York Times “Super Doctor”
- 2009, 2010 Best Doctors (USA)
- 2008-2010 Castle Connolly, Top Doctors for the New York Metro Area, 10th, 11th & 12th Editions
- 2004 Visiting professor, University of Michigan, Department of Orthopedic Surgery
- 2002 Robert Bayley Osgood Award for Best Basic Science Paper/Thesis Harvard Combined Residency Program
- 1999 Orthopaedic Research and Education Foundation Grant
- 1994 Magna cum laude, Harvard Medical School
- 1993 Howard Hughes Medical Merit Scholarship Award for Outstanding Research
- 1993 Howard Hughes Medical Institute Research Fellowship
- 1993 Soma Weiss Research Fellow, Harvard Medical School
- 1990 NIH Summer Research Training Fellowship
- 1989 Magna cum laude, Brown University
- 1988 Eleven academic high distinction notations
- 1988 Appointed Meiklejohn Academic Fellow, Brown University

== Books and chapters ==
- Hecht AC, Leon SP, Kelly RA, and Lilly LS: Cardiovascular Drugs, Pathophysiology of Heart Disease, Lea & Febiger: Philadelphia & London, 1992, pp. 272–305 Outlook/Perspectives in Colon & Rectal Surgery, 5(6):4-6, 1992
- Hecht AC, Silcox HD, Whitesides TE: Injuries to the Cervicoranium, Skeletal Trauma: Fractures, Dislocations and Ligamentous Injuries, Ed. Browner B, Jupiter JB, Levine, A and Trafton P, WB Saunders Company: Philadelphia, 2003
- Hecht AC, Boden SD: Biology of Spine Fusion, in Advanced Spinal Surgical Technologies, ed. Corbin T, Connolly P, Yuan H, Bao Q, Boden SD, Quality Medical Publishing: St Louis
- Hecht AC, Scott D, Critchlow R, Pedlow FX: Treatment of Metastatic Disease of the Spine, Adult and Pediatric Spine, 3rd edition, ed. Frymoyer J, Lippincott Williams & Wilkins, pp. 247–289, 2004
- Scott D, Hornicek FJ, Hecht AC, and Pedlow FX, in Treatment of Primary Sarcomas of the Spine, Adult and Pediatric Spine, 3rd edition, ed. Frymoyer J, Lippincott Williams and Wilkins, pp. 191–247, 2004
- Qureshi S, Hecht AC: Epidemiology of Spinal Cord Injury, Atlas of Spine Trauma: Adult and Pediatric, ed. Kim DH, Ludwig SC, Vaccaro A, Elsevier, 2008
- Chen, M, Qureshi S, Hecht AC: Anterior Thoracic Corpectomy, Operative Techniques in Orthopaedic Surgery, ed. Weisel S, Lippincott Williams and Wilkins, in print.
- Qureshi S, Hecht AC: Anterior approach to the thoracic spine, Operative Techniques in Orthopaedic Surgery, ed. Weisel S, Lippincott Williams and Wilkins, in print.
- Boden SD, Bostrom PG, Haydon R, Hecht AC, Kirkpatrick J, Lee FY, Leet A, Levine W, McKellop HA, Miclau T, Nelson F, Parvizi J, Sherma PJ, Wright TM, Orthopaedic Basic Science Self Assessment Examination, American Academy of Orthopaedic Surgery, 2006

== Publications ==
- Towle CA, Wright M, Hecht AC, Kuong SJ, Papanicolas LE, Totkovic R, Mankin HJ, Treadwell BV: A Matrix Metalloproteinase Proenzyme Activator Produced by Articular Cartilage, Biochem Biophys Res Commun, 247(2):324-331, 1998 PMID 9642125
- Snyder BD, Hauser-Kara DA, Hipp JA, Zurakowski D, Hecht AC, Gebhardt MC: Predicting fracture through benign skeletal lesions with quantitative computed tomography, J Bone Joint Surg Am 2006, 88(1): 55- 70 PMID 16391250
- Hecht AC, Degradative Enzyme Systems in Articular Cartilage: Purification, Characterization and Role in Cartilage Degradation of a Novel Serine Protease Isolated from Bovine Articular Cartilage. Thesis, 1994 (awarded magna cum laude Harvard Medical School)
- Hecht AC, Silcox H, and Heller JG: A biomechanical and clinical study of transarticular screw fixation with onlay bone grafting. (to be submitted to Spine 2008)
- Lewandrowski KU, Hecht AC, Delaney TF, Chapman PA, Hornieck FJ, and Pedlow FX. Anterior spinal arthrodesis with structural cortical allografts and instrumentation for spine tumor surgery, Spine, 29(10):1150-1159, 2004 PMID 15131446
- Hecht AC, Chen M and Jenkins A: Minimally Invasive approach for far lateral disc herniations at L5-S1: A novel technique and report of 2 patients, Journal of Spinal Disorders and Techniques, (submitted to Journal of Spinal Disorders and Techniques, 2008)
- Taitsman LA, Altman DT, Hecht AC, and Pedlow FX. Complications of Cervical Halo-Vest Orthoses in Elderly Patients, Orthopedics, 31(5):446, 2008 PMID 19292320
- Singh H, Hecht AC, and Jenkins AL, Novel Fluoroscopic Technique for Localization at Cervicothoracic Levels, Journal of Spinal Disorders and Techniques, 22(8):615-8 PMID 19956037
- Koehler SM, Lin JD, Stets KC, Qureshi SA, Martins DA and Hecht AC: Case Report: Lumbar Spinous Process Avulsion Fracture in an Adolescent Dancer, Clinical Journal of Sport Medicine, 20(3):213-4, 2010 PMID 20445364
- Koehler SM, Beasley MB, Chin CS, Wittig JC, Hecht AC, Qureshi SA, Synovial Sarcoma of the Thoracic Spine, Spine Journal, Dec 9(12):el-6, 2009 PMID 19800298
- Hecht AC, Koehler SM, Laudone JC, Jenkins AJ, Qureshi SA, Is Intraoperative CT of Posterior Cervical Spine Instrumentation Cost Effective and Does it Reduce Complications, Clinical Orthopaedics And Related Research, October 2010 PMID 20922584
- Bronson WH, Koehler SM, Qureshi SA, and Hecht AC, Importance of plain film radiography in the evaluation of low back pain and radiculopathy due to recurrent lumbar disc herniation, Orthopaedics, 12:33(5), 2010
