= Martha's Vineyard Hospital =

- Mass General Brigham

Geography
- Location: Oak Bluffs, Massachusetts, United States
- Coordinates: 41°27′38.58″N 70°34′47.03″W

Helipads
- Helipad: (FAA LID: MA62)
Number	Length		Surface
Number	ft	m	Surface
H1	35	11	Asphalt

History
- Founded: 1921

Links
- Website: http://mvhospital.org/
- Lists: Hospitals in Massachusetts

Martha's Vineyard Hospital (MVH) is a not-for-profit community hospital located in Oak Bluffs, Massachusetts, a town on the island of Martha's Vineyard. Founded in 1921, it is the only hospital in Dukes County. The hospital is part of Mass General Brigham. MVH also owns a nursing home, the Windemere Nursing & Rehabilitation Center, located on its campus.

In 2021, MVH operated with revenues of $114 million and had 31 licensed beds. They reported 14,068 ED visits and 1,364 inpatient discharges.
