= Paul Nathaniel Temple Jr. =

Paul Nathaniel Temple Jr. (March 19, 1923 - November 29th, 2016) was the Chairman Emeritus and co-founder of the Institute of Noetic Sciences and the Chairman of the Board of BioGenesis Enterprises.

== Biography ==
Paul graduated from Princeton University in 1944 and Harvard Law School in 1948. From 1954 to 1961 he was an international petroleum concessions negotiator for Exxon. He and astronaut Edgar Mitchell co-founded the Institute of Noetic Sciences in 1973. He has been a member of the Institute of Noetic Sciences board of directors since 1973 and was the chairman from 1983 to 1999. He created the Temple Awards for Creative Altruism. He helps fund The Fellowship Foundation, a U.S.-based religious and political organization founded in 1935 by Methodist minister Abraham Vereide. Paul N. Temple was an insider "core member" of the Fellowship Foundation and/or Institute for Christian Leadership since the 1940s. Others classified with him in that category, per the Billy Graham Archives of Wheaton College included James Bell, Frank Carlson, Chuck Colson, Billy Graham, Wallace Haines, Mark Hatfield, Fred Heyn, Karlis Leyasmeyer and Albert Quie.
