= Nantucket Cottage Hospital =

Community hospital in Massachusetts

- Mass General Brigham

Geography
- Location: 57 Prospect Street, Nantucket, Massachusetts, United States
- Coordinates: 41°16′30.78″N 70°6′3.90″W

Organization
- Type: Community

Services
- Standards: Joint Commission
- Emergency department: Yes

Helipads
- Helipad: FAA LID: 57MA
Number	Length		Surface
Number	ft	m	Surface
H1	44	13	Concrete

History
- Opened: 1911 (115 years ago)

Links
- Website: www.nantuckethospital.org
- Lists: Hospitals in Massachusetts

Nantucket Cottage Hospital is a not-for-profit regional medical center located in Nantucket, Massachusetts, United States and is the only hospital on the island.

== History and operations ==
Founded in 1911 and conceived by the visions of Dr. John S. Grouard and Dr. Benjamin Sharp. The original small cottage hospital on West Chester Street grew apace with the island community's needs.

In 1957, the hospital opened new facilities at its current site, 57 Prospect Street. In the 1960s, when that building was deemed too small, a wing was added to accommodate the growing need for comprehensive medical care.

In 2006, the hospital became an affiliate of Massachusetts General Hospital.

A new 106,000-square-foot hospital building completely replaced the 1957 facility in 2019. Thanks to a $120 million capital campaign, the largest in Nantucket history, the new hospital was built entirely through private donations, debt-free, and with no taxpayer dollars.

The chairman of the board of trustees is Craig Muhlhauser, the hospital chief executive officer is Amy E. Lee.
