= Dean Radin =

American parapsychologist

- Born: February 29, 1952 (age 74)
- Education: BS in Electrical Engineering, University of Massachusetts Amherst: Master's in Electrical Engineering, University of Illinois at Urbana-Champaign; PhD in Educational Psychology, University of Illinois at Urbana-Champaign
- Occupation: Parapsychologist
- Musical career
- Genre: Classical
- Instrument: Violin

Dean Radin (/ˈreɪdɪn/; born February 29, 1952) is an American parapsychologist.

Following a bachelor and master's degree in electrical engineering and a PhD in educational psychology Radin worked at Bell Labs, as a researcher at Princeton University and the University of Edinburgh, and was a faculty member at University of Nevada, Las Vegas.

He then became Chief Scientist at the Institute of Noetic Sciences (IONS) in Petaluma, California, USA, later becoming the president of the Parapsychological Association. He is also co-editor-in-chief of the journal Explore: The Journal of Science and Healing.

Radin's paranormal ideas and work have been widely criticized by skeptic scientists and philosophers.

== Education ==
Following a career in classical violin, Radin went on to earn an undergraduate degree in electrical engineering from the University of Massachusetts Amherst, as well as both a master's degree in electrical engineering and a doctorate in educational psychology from the University of Illinois at Urbana-Champaign. After his graduation, Radin worked at Bell Labs, and then conducted research at Princeton University, GTE Laboratories, University of Edinburgh, SRI International, Interval Research Corporation. From 1994 to 1997 he was a faculty member at University of Nevada, Las Vegas.

== Parapsychology ==
Radin was elected president of the Parapsychological Association in 1988, 1993, 1998, and 2005, and has published a number of articles and papers supporting the existence of paranormal phenomena, as well as two books directed to a popular audience: The Conscious Universe and Entangled Minds. Radin believes that parapsychology is as repeatable as any scientific discipline, but that it is also, as paraphrased by sociologist Erich Goode, "elusive, subtle and complex", a field of study that is "difficult to replicate" and that "our understanding of it is incomplete".

Radin's paranormal claims have been rejected by those in the skeptical and mainstream scientific communities, some of whom have suggested that Radin's beliefs embrace pseudoscience and that he misunderstands the nature of science. The physicist Robert L. Park has written "No proof of psychic phenomena is ever found. In spite of all the tests devised by parapsychologists like Jahn and Radin, and huge amounts of data collected over a period of many years, the results are no more convincing today than when they began their experiments."

Chris French criticized Radin for his selective historical overview of parapsychology and for ignoring clear evidence of fraud. French recounts that the medium Florence Cook was caught in acts of trickery and two of the Fox sisters confessed to fraud, but that Radin did not mention this fact. Radin has claimed the results from parapsychological research are as consistent by the same standards as any other scientific discipline, but Ray Hyman has written that many parapsychologists disagree with this, openly admitting that the evidence for parapsychology is "inconsistent, irreproducible, and fails to meet acceptable scientific standards".

Radin and his colleagues have suggested that small-scale studies have produced a "genuine psychokinetic effect", but critics have asserted that Radin has not shown evidence that the null hypothesis of such an effect could be confidently rejected. Further, psychologists David B. Wilson and William R. Shadish, writing in Psychological Bulletin, criticized claims made by Radin and his associates that human minds can psychically influence random number generators, saying that parapsychologists "need to go beyond statistics and explain how the mind might influence a computer, then test that prediction". Radin has appealed to quantum mechanics as a mechanism, claiming that it can explain the non-locality and backward causality associated with psi phenomena, though such ideas are harshly criticized by many physicists who study quantum mechanics as being pseudoscientific. (Note: See also Quantum mysticism and Quantum mind) Radin has written that not all people experience paranormal phenomena (or see ghosts) because they block such signals due to the process of latent inhibition.

== Books ==
While Radin's books have been reviewed favorably by groups that give general reviews such as Publishers Weekly and Kirkus Reviews, independent reviews by scientists and skeptics, as cited below, have often been negative.

=== The Conscious Universe ===
A critical review of The Conscious Universe: The Scientific Truth of Psychic Phenomena (1997) (Note: In Great Britain this book is titled The Noetic Universe.) was published by the British mathematician I. J. Good in Nature. The review charged that Radin ignored the known hoaxes in the field, made statistical errors and ignored plausible non-paranormal explanations for parapsychological data. Good wrote about flaws in Radin's method for evaluating the file-drawer effect. Radin replied to Good in a follow-up letter in the correspondence pages of Nature, saying that Good in his review had misinterpreted a reference to a probability value. Good replied, saying that most readers would not arrive at the same interpretation of what Radin had written noting that readers would be surprised to learn that by "more than a billion trillion", Radin meant more than 10^{100}. Further, Good noted that the file drawer effect does not account for intentional fraud, as was very probably the case with prominent ESP proponents such as Samuel Soal, nor is there any real means of estimating such "intellectual, observational or ethical lapses" within ESP. In 2002, Victor J. Stenger gave a criticism of The Conscious Universe that aligned with Good's arguments that Radin did not perform the file-drawer analysis correctly, made fundamental errors in his calculations, and ignored non-paranormal explanations for the data.

The book was reviewed by the philosopher and skeptic Robert Todd Carroll in a thirteen-page chapter-by-chapter critique which noted how Radin had not cited the skeptical literature on the subject of parapsychology. Carroll stated that Radin had ignored "the many hoaxes and frauds that dot the landscape in the history of psi research."

=== Supernormal ===
Radin's book Supernormal: Science, Yoga, and the Evidence for Extraordinary Psychic Abilities (2013), argues support for psychic phenomena, linking them to the siddhis from yoga-related legends. Publishers Weekly has reviewed it, saying of the book, that it is "unfocused and opaque at times" but "nevertheless an admirable attempt to bridge the gap between the scientific and the spiritual realm". The anonymous review by Kirkus Reviews gave it a positive review saying "certainly not for everyone, but a smart reminder that we haven’t got the whole scene covered".

Dale DeBakcsy, writing for the Skeptical Inquirer, a bimonthly American general-audience magazine published by the Committee for Skeptical Inquiry, reviewed Supernormal and criticized the work as "misrepresenting report data, lowering success criteria, and playing a somewhat loose game with how rigorously confidence information is presented". Debakcsy examined Radin's claim that a meta-analysis of forced choice recognition published in parapsychological literature showed that Psi effects were present above chance to a probability of 10^{15} to 1, noting that the study also reported that results varied wildly with an extremely unusual standard deviation, such that they dropped 10% of the most extreme variations which reduced the effect size. According to DeBakcsy, Radin chose not to report those variations.

Debakcsy also criticized Radin's characterization of the results of a free-response experiment conducted at Princeton. Radin cited a test subject's response when asked to describe the future location of a distant agent:

"A rather strange yet persistent image of [the agent] inside a large bowl—a hemispheric indentation in the ground of some smooth man-made materials like concrete or cement. No color. Possibly covered with a glass dome. Unusual sense of inside/outside simultaneity. That’s all. It’s a large bowl. If it was full of soup [the agent] would be the size of a large dumpling!"

Radin wrote that the subject's response "successfully" described the actual randomly selected location of the distant agent: the Radio telescope at Kitt Peak. Debakcsy noted that there are several radio telescopes at Kitt Peak, such as the Very Long Baseline Array, but that telescope does not match the description given. DeBakcsy contends that, while the ARO 12m Radio Telescope has some similar characteristics, it also differs in several aspects from the subject's description. DeBakcsy further commented that, considering this is the best example out of 653 possible other tests made at Princeton, it is quite poor. Noting the spread of meta-analyses of the same studies (where the individual studies are weighted differently), have wildly varying odds returned (from trillions to one, to indistinguishable from chance), DeBakcsy argues that this undermines the reliance on meta-analysis in the work since they lack standardization.

=== Other books ===
- Entangled Minds: Extrasensory Experiences in a Quantum Reality (Paraview / Pocket Books, 2006) ISBN 9781416516774
  - Second edition: Simon & Schuster, 2009. ISBN 9781439187937
- The Noetic Universe (Random House, 2011) ISBN 9781446438886 (British version of The Conscious Universe)
- Real Magic: Ancient Wisdom, Modern Science, and a Guide to the Secret Power of the Universe Harmony Books, 2018) ISBN 9781524758820
- Radin, D., Wahbeh, H., Yount, G., Brophy, T., Taddeo, S., & Delorme, A. (2026). Nonlocal Experiences in a Quantum Reality. In: Azevedo, E., Pissolato Filho, J. (eds) Information Fields Theory and Applications. Studies in Rhythm Engineering. Springer, Singapore. ISBN 9789819517411
