= Anne Klibanski =

American endocrinologist (born 1951)

- Born: 1951 (age 74–75)
- Education: Barnard College (BA); New York University (MD)
- Awards: Clinical Investigator Award (Endocrine Society); Clinical Endocrinology Trust Medal (Society for Endocrinology)
- Scientific career
- Fields: Endocrinology; Neuroendocrinology
- Workplaces: Harvard Medical School; Mass General Brigham; Massachusetts General Hospital

Anne Klibanski (born 1951) is an American endocrinologist and the Laurie Carrol Guthart Professor of Medicine at Harvard Medical School. She has been president and CEO of Mass General Brigham since 2019, becoming the first woman to lead the health system, Massachusetts's largest private employer. Previously, she spent decades on the faculty of Massachusetts General Hospital and Harvard Medical School, where she conducted research on hypopituitarism, pituitary tumors, and metabolic bone disease. In 1997, she became the first woman from MGH's Department of Medicine to be named a professor of medicine at Harvard.

As CEO, Klibanski's multimillion-dollar compensation has repeatedly drawn press scrutiny and criticism amid broader debate over executive pay in nonprofit healthcare. Her pay became a point of contention during 2025–2026 labor disputes between the health system and its nurses and resident physicians, including a July 2026 strike by Brigham and Women's Hospital nurses described as the largest nursing walkout in Massachusetts history.

She currently serves as the chair of the Board of Trustees at the Massachusetts Health & Hospital Association.

== Early life and education ==
Klibanski studied literature at Barnard College, graduating magna cum laude, before earning a medical degree in 1975 from the Grossman School of Medicine at New York University (NYU). She completed an internal medicine residency at New York University in 1978, and completed fellowships in endocrinology, diabetes, and metabolism at Massachusetts General Hospital in 1981.

== Career ==
=== Academic and research career ===
Klibanski became chief of the Neuroendocrine Unit at Massachusetts General Hospital, studying hormones and neuroendocrinology with a focus on hypopituitarism and pituitary tumors. Her clinical research has also examined the effects of hypothalamic and pituitary disorders on body composition and bone density, including bone loss associated with anorexia nervosa and growth hormone deficiency. In 1997, Klibanski became the first woman from Mass General's Department of Medicine to become a professor of medicine at Harvard.

She has authored more than 350 peer-reviewed papers and book chapters and has received the Endocrine Society Clinical Investigator Award and the Clinical Endocrinology Trust Medal from the Society for Endocrinology. Klibanski has served on the National Institute of Diabetes and Digestive and Kidney Diseases Board of Counselors and the editorial board of the Journal of Clinical Endocrinology and Metabolism, and is a past president of the Pituitary Society. She established the Center for Faculty Development at Massachusetts General Hospital and mentored more than fifty women, for which she received the Endocrine Society's Outstanding Mentor Award.

=== Leadership at Partners HealthCare and Mass General Brigham ===
In 2012, she became Chief Academic Officer at Partners HealthCare System, overseeing roughly $1.7 billion in annual research funding across the system. She led an initiative reported to save $10 million annually in radiology programs and helped establish funding for a large biobank. After being named interim president and chief executive officer in February 2019, she was appointed president and CEO in June 2019, becoming the first woman to lead Massachusetts's largest private employer. In 2020, she launched the United Against Racism initiative at MGB, working to combat racism and improve health equity within the community.

Klibanski serves as Harvard's academic dean for Mass General Brigham and is an ex officio member of its board. She also serves on the executive committee of the Greater Boston Chamber of Commerce and on the board of the Massachusetts Competitive Partnership. In January 2026, Klibanski was elected Chair of the Board of Trustees of the Massachusetts Health & Hospital Association (MHA).

=== Anne Klibanski Visiting Scholars Award ===
The Anne Klibanski Visiting Scholars Award is granted annually through The Mass General Center for Faculty Development. It was created to recognize "Women with exceptional promise as leaders in their field".

== Controversies ==
=== Executive compensation ===
Klibanski's compensation as CEO of Mass General Brigham has repeatedly drawn press coverage and criticism as part of broader debate over executive pay in nonprofit healthcare. Reporting on filings released in August 2025 found that Klibanski received $8.4 million in total compensation, making her the highest-paid hospital executive in Massachusetts that year. MGB board chair Scott Sperling defended the package, citing what he called her "clear-eyed leadership" through disruptive federal policy actions affecting research funding and an inpatient capacity crisis.

According to tax filings, Klibanski's total compensation increased to $6 million in 2022 at a time when compensation fell for several peer hospital CEOs in Massachusetts. More than half of the total was a $3.37 million bonus, 41 percent above her base salary. By contrast, the CEO of Beth Israel Lahey Health saw his pay fall 47 percent to $2.8 million in 2022, and the CEO of the Dana-Farber Cancer Institute earned $2.33 million, down 41 percent.

In 2025, Klibanski received nearly $9.2 million in total compensation, an increase of about 9 percent as compensation rose for most major Massachusetts health system executives. Mass General Brigham said her compensation ranked in the bottom third among chief executives of comparable nonprofit health systems nationally. The Committee of Interns and Residents, the union representing MGB's resident physicians and fellows, noted that her annual pay is 193 times that of the system's lowest-paid employee.

=== Role in protests and strikes ===
In March 2025, resident physicians and attending physicians picketed outside Massachusetts General Hospital, citing understaffing following layoffs carried out as part of a system-wide restructuring at Mass General Brigham. Klibanski said the decision had been reached by clinical, academic and administrative leaders across the system, and that the changes were intended to improve efficiency and preserve resources for patient care and future investment.

In July 2026, approximately 4,000 Brigham and Women’s Hospital nurses went on strike amid a contract dispute with Mass General Brigham over pay, staffing, and health insurance costs, the largest nursing strike in Massachusetts history. Klibanski's compensation was among the grievances cited by the Massachusetts Nurses Association during the dispute, which pointed to her high executive pay as emblematic of the union's objections to hospital wage offers. Klibanski did not participate directly in bargaining sessions, which were instead handled by board representatives.

== Books ==
- Prolactin Disorders: From Basic Science to Clinical Management (Springer Publishing, 2019) ISBN 9783030118358
- Neuroendocrine Consequences of Anorexia Nervosa in Adolescents (Chapter 14) of Pediatric Neuroendocrinology (Karger, 2009) ISBN 978-3-8055-9303-8
