= Brigham and Women's Faulkner Hospital =

Coordinates: 42°18′02.89″N 71°07′41.34″W

- Mass General Brigham
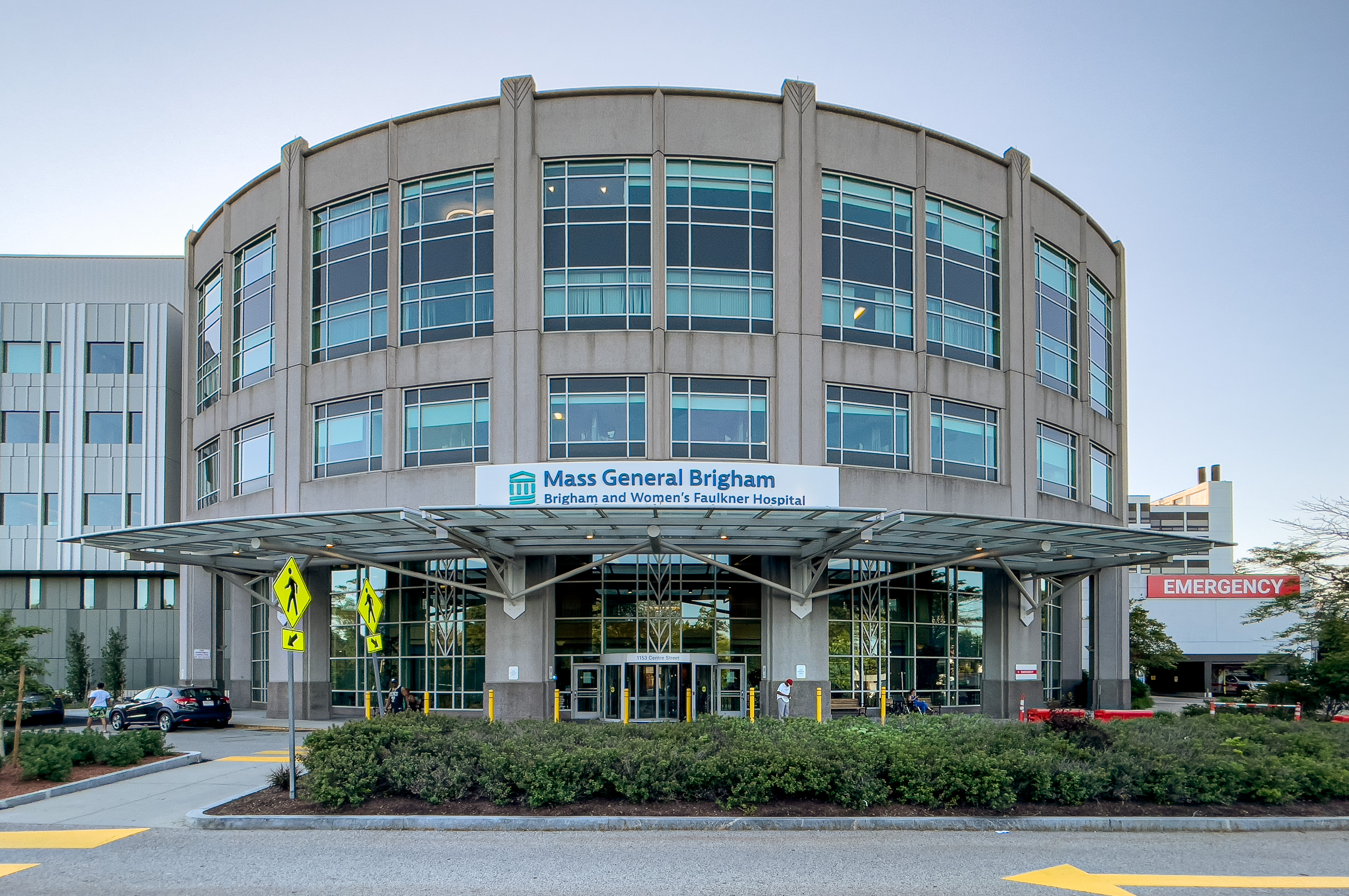
- Main entrance of Brigham and Women's Faulkner Hospital

Geography
- Location: 1153 Centre Street, Boston, Massachusetts, United States

Organization
- Type: Teaching

Services
- Beds: 171

History
- Founded: 1900

Links
- Website: www.brighamandwomensfaulkner.org
- Lists: Hospitals in Massachusetts

Brigham and Women's Faulkner Hospital (BWFH) is a 171-bed, non-profit community teaching hospital located in Boston, Massachusetts. Founded in 1900, it is located in the neighborhood of Jamaica Plain across the street from the Arnold Arboretum and just 3.4 miles (5.5 km) from Longwood Medical and Academic Area.

== History ==
Founded in 1900 in the neighborhood of Jamaica Plain, Faulkner Hospital joined with Brigham and Women's Hospital in 1998 to form a common parent company, Brigham and Women's/Faulkner Hospitals, a member of Mass General Brigham (MGB). The resulting partnership offers Brigham and Women's Faulkner Hospital patients access to many of the same physicians and services as Brigham and Women's Hospital.

"The Faulkner" (as it is popularly known) offers comprehensive medical, surgical and psychiatric care as well as complete emergency, outpatient and diagnostic services. The hospital's largest inpatient services are internal medicine, cardiology, psychiatry, orthopedics, gastroenterology and general/GI surgery. Effective October 1, 2012, Faulkner Hospital was renamed to Brigham and Women's Faulkner Hospital (BWFH).

In 2022, state regulators approved a $2 billion expansion plan which MGB put forth, including a $150 million addition to the Faulkner campus. The project was to add 78 new patient beds and completed in 2025. The ribbon-cutting ceremony for the Brigham and Women's Faulkner Hospital building expansion took place on June 8, 2025. Included were a new parking garage, five-story medical building, and exterior changes. Patient capacity was increased by 45%, with 78 new inpatient rooms.

Kevin Giordano was named president of the hospital, as well as its COO, in April 2024.

Workers at the hospital staged a walkout in January 2023 over wages, after a union contract negotiation that had lasted six months. After a nurses strike was averted with a tentative agreement in late 2024, on July 25, 2025, 99% of nurses at the hospital voted to go on a one-day strike over salaries and low morale.

== See also ==
- Lists of hospitals
