= Cooley Dickinson Hospital =

Hospital in Massachusetts, US

- Mass General Brigham

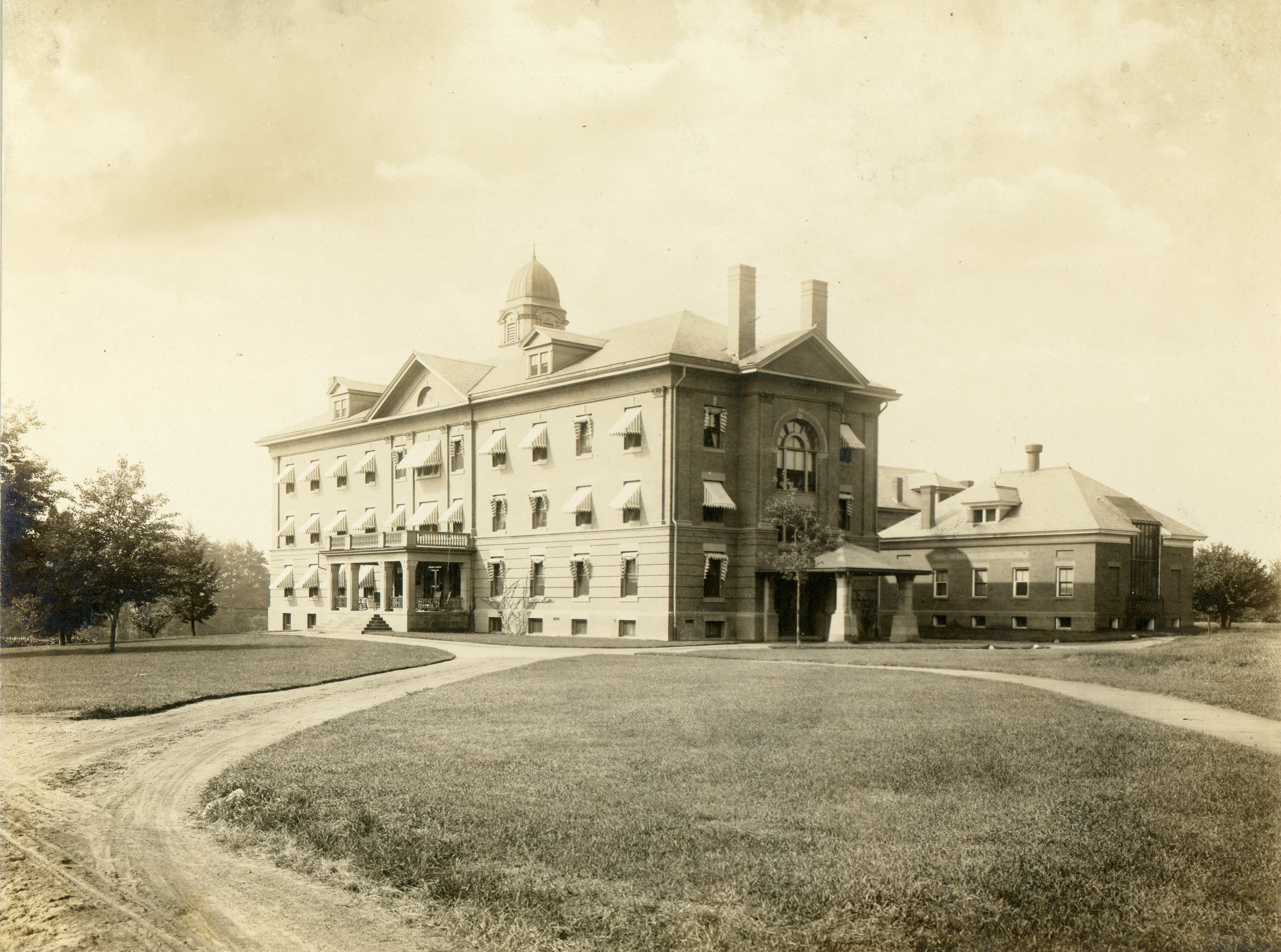
- Cooley Dickinson Hospital, 1918

Geography
- Location: Northampton, Massachusetts, United States
- Coordinates: 42.3305027°N 72.6531304°W

Organization
- Type: Community

Services
- Beds: 140

History
- Founded: 1886

Links
- Website: www.cooleydickinson.org
- Lists: Hospitals in Massachusetts
- Other links: List of hospitals in the United States

Cooley Dickinson Hospital is a nonprofit community hospital located in Northampton, Massachusetts. It is the primary hub of Cooley Dickinson Health Care, a regional network of primary and specialty care medical providers, an affiliate of Massachusetts General Hospital, which is part of Mass General Brigham.

== Facilities and current operations ==
Cooley Dickinson Hospital has 140 licensed beds and 11 licensed bassinets. It is used by more than 77,000 community members a year. Notable subsections of the facility include its Childbirth Center, the Kittredge Surgery Center and the Mass General Cancer Center at Cooley Dickinson Hospital.

Cooley Dickinson Health Care encompasses more than 20 locations in the Pioneer Valley including members of Cooley Dickinson Medical Group, and Cooley Dickinson VNA & Hospice, a homecare provider that employs nurses, rehabilitation therapists and social workers in western Massachusetts. The organization is a major regional employer, retaining approximately 2,000 employees, and provides funding for numerous other nonprofit and community health organizations.

== Affiliated institutions ==
Since 2013, Cooley Dickinson Hospital has been an affiliate of Massachusetts General Hospital. In addition to shared billing and medical records, the hospitals currently collaborate in the areas of tele-medicine (stroke), maternal-fetal medicine, organ transplant evaluation and cancer treatment. Since 2001, Cooley Dickinson has worked in partnership with the UMass Amherst School of Nursing to help train and to recruit nurses.

== History ==
The Cooley Dickinson Hospital was founded with a bequest from the will of Caleb Cooley Dickinson, a descendant of Nathaniel Dickinson, the first settler in Hatfield, Massachusetts, and a cousin of poet Emily Dickinson. It was originally established as a "Hospital for the sick poor," and admitted its first patient in 1886.

From 1901 to 1975, the facility turned out thousands of graduates from its Cooley Dickinson School of Nursing, including hundreds trained through an accelerated program during World War II for the U.S. Cadet Nurse Corps.

In the summer of 1964, U.S Senator Edward Kennedy spent approximately two weeks at Cooley Dickinson Hospital recovering from a plane crash in neighboring Southampton, before being moved to New England Baptist Hospital in Boston. The crash killed the plane's pilot, Edwin Zimny, and one of Kennedy's aides, Edward Moss, whose name is still honored by a Cooley Dickinson nursing scholarship that Kennedy established in his memory. Fellow Senator Birch Bayh (D-IN) and his wife Marvella also survived the crash and were also treated at Cooley Dickinson Hospital.

In 2011, amid the nation's recovery from the 2008 financial crisis which led to widespread mergers and acquisitions across healthcare, Cooley Dickinson Hospital sought a new owner to avoid closure. Among candidates which included Baystate Health and Vanguard Health Systems, an overwhelming majority of staff supported acquisition by Mass General Brigham. The state approved the merger, and in 2013 Cooley Dickinson joined the Mass General Brigham system.
