= Lorna Byrne =

Irish author and peace ambassador

- Born: 25 March 1953; Dublin, Ireland
- Writing career
- Years active: 2008–present
- Notable works: Angels in my Hair, Love from Heaven
- Website: www.lornabyrne.com

Lorna Byrne (born 25 March 1953) is an Irish author and peace ambassador. She is best known for her bestselling memoir, Angels in My Hair (2008). A Message of Hope from the Angels (2012) and Love from Heaven (2014) debuted at No. 1 on the UK Sunday Times Book Chart. Her books have been translated into 30 languages and published in over 50 countries. Byrne says that she sees angels and spirits on a daily, continuous basis. She has been featured in many media outlets, including the BBC, CNN, The Economist, The Observer, and the Daily Telegraph.

== Biography ==
=== Early life ===
Byrne was born in Dublin, and grew up in poverty in the Dublin suburbs of Kilmainham and Ballymun. She relates that she has seen angels since she was a baby. "I see angels physically and I have done so since I was a baby. I know this is hard to believe, and I know that there are some people who will never believe me, regardless of what I say or do. I have no idea why I see angels and others don’t; I am just an ordinary woman. When I have asked the angels around me about this, their reply has simply been "Why not you?" She was labeled as "retarded" when very young, and speculates that this might be because she was so often in her own world. Lorna's childhood was challenging for many reasons, including difficult family relations because Lorna was often observed as different resulting in something of an ‘outsider’ status. Despite a specific learning difficulty that makes it hard for someone to learn to read, write and spell correctly, as well as a misconception as to her learning capabilities, Lorna has achieved many things.

=== Marriage and children ===
Byrne married Joe in 1976. She relates that when she was young an angel showed her a vision of the man she would marry, and told her they would be happy and have children, but that she would need to care for him and that he would die young. Their married life was spent in a cottage near Maynooth, in County Kildare. They had four children. As she conveys having been told, Joe was often in poor health, and he died in 2000.

=== Public life ===
Byrne has said that the angels told her many years ago that she would write of them. "When I was a child the angels used to tell me I would write about God and them," she has said, "but I didn't use to take any notice of them… but even when Angel Michael said to me that it is getting near your time I was telling him, 'Stop pestering me. How does God expect me to write a book when I can't read or write at all?' He said help would be sent to me. And it was." "It filled me with fear of being laughed at and ridiculed," she has said. "But right from when I was a child the angels told me that my story would go all around the world, that it would be a bestseller, though they did not use those words."

==== Writing ====
Angels in My Hair is a memoir of her early and married life. Stairways to Heaven (2010) is a memoir of life after the death of her husband, including the story of writing her first book and becoming a public figure. She states that it contains many details of how angels work in the world. A Message of Hope from the Angels is about the importance of hope "in these challenging times".

Love from Heaven (2014) introduced the topic of what she describes as a lack of love in the world today, and discusses the importance of loving oneself, which she says is necessary for being able to love others. She also stated for the first time that she sees the force of love as she does angels. The Year With Angels (2016) helps readers to recognise their spiritual side through the different seasons of the year, and includes photographs of Ireland in the four seasons. Angels at my Fingertips (2017) is a sequel to Angels in my Hair, containing descriptions of events throughout Byrne's life and taking her autobiographical writing up to 2017. It contains descriptions of visionary experiences of historical figures and detailed exercises for connecting to guardian angels.

A book on prayer, Prayers from the Heart, was published in 2018. This includes advice on how to pray, and prayers for many situations. My Guardian Angel, My Best Friend (2020) is a book of stories for children, inspired by real life, written to tell children they each have a guardian angel. Illustrations in the book are by Aideen Byrne, Lorna's daughter.

Byrne regularly writes a newsletter for e-mail subscribers and posts on Facebook, Twitter and Instagram and from 2013 till 2017 also blogged for The Huffington Post

==== Charitable work ====
In 2015, Byrne established the Lorna Byrne Children's Foundation, which supports the work of charities helping children in need. Funds the Foundation raises are currently split between UNICEF Ireland, which is supporting children affected by the Syrian Civil War; APA — A Partnership with Africa, which supports the self-empowerment of women and children in Ethiopia and Tanzania; and in Limerick, Narrative 4, which uses the power of storytelling to grow empathy in children and help them improve their lives and communities, and the Children's Grief Centre, which supports children experiencing loss by bereavement of parental separation. From 2015 until 2017, Blue Box Creative Learning Centre, which provides art therapy was funded. Money is raised through public donations and speaking events.

Lorna Byrne and a group of friends, guided by the angels and shared values, have established a non-profit organisation named The Seraph Foundation. The Seraph Foundation has established a retreat facility, called Sanctuary, at Kilfane Demesne, which includes Kilfane House, in Thomastown, Co. Kilkenny. Since 2023, retreats for the general public, led by Byrne, are regularly being offered at Sanctuary. The object of the Seraph Foundation is for people from around the world, of all backgrounds and beliefs to come together, promote religious & social tolerance, inspire hope, encourage mindfulness & wellbeing while developing spiritually, guided by the teachings of Lorna Byrne and the Angels.

==== Travel and peace work ====
Since becoming a well-known author, Byrne has engaged in book tours, and has spoken in other contexts to many public audiences across Europe and the United States.

She has travelled repeatedly to the United States, a country she believes is pivotal in the future of the world.

I am told America will play a huge role in the evolution of mankind. That from America will come many of the ideas and initiatives that will create a better world and will help unify countries. The angels tell me America is supposed to be a beacon of hope for the world.

In 2011, Byrne expressed her support for Occupy Wall Street. In 2014, she attended the UN Climate Summit and the People's Climate March. In 2014 and 2015, much of her work was devoted to fostering unity between Sunni and Shia Muslims in America, which Byrne believes is important in influencing American foreign policy in the Middle East.

"Muslims have been gathered over the years from different countries and different strands of Islam to America. If Muslims who have come to America can unify, can leave behind their historic and outdated baggage and become one, they will send out a powerful sign to Muslims living in other parts of the world. They will provide an example by living together in peace side by side.

In February 2014, the Nobel Peace Prize laureate Betty Williams joined Byrne at the Sufi Mosque at Tribeca for a prayer event for unity among Muslims.

Media appearances in the United States have included a 2012 interview on CNN, and interviews in 2010 and 2012 on Coast to Coast AM with George Noory.

Byrne has travelled to be a subject in two full-scale documentaries: the American production The Lady Who Sees Angels, which was directed by Ted Yacucci and released in 2015; and, to raise funds for the Lorna Byrne Children's Foundation, an Irish production filmed in Ethiopia, The Future belongs to the Young, directed by Hugh Chaloner and released in 2017.

In 2014 she stated that the war in Syria had the potential to spread, and poses a great danger to the rest of the world.

"I have been shown what could happen if the situation in Syria is not resolved; I have been shown how a major conflict could develop that leads to a massive loss of life all around the world, with consequences that impact us all. I have been shown the survivors of humanity feeling such despair and anger that we, the people of the world, had not done enough to diffuse [sic] this situation, that the leaders of the world and Syria didn’t do enough to stop it, and that the people of the world were too preoccupied with that was going on in their own lives to stand up and demand that their leaders act.

She has organised a day of prayer for peace in Syria.

== Views and beliefs ==
=== Spiritual views and beliefs ===
Byrne says that she sees physically and communicates with angels on a day-to-day basis. She most strongly emphasizes, and is best known to the public for saying, that everyone regardless of belief has a guardian angel, who loves the person they protect, never leaves their side for even a moment, and can be asked for help. The guardian angel can also allow other angels to help the person in their life.

I see them as physically as I see someone standing in front of me. I have never seen anyone without a guardian angel. I see them with people of all religions and none, with people who are good and bad, with people who believe in angels and with those who don’t. I understand that for some people it’s hard to believe that there could be such a thing as an angel, or even that I can see angels. I can't prove the existence of angels, or that I see them. I wish I could. All I can do is tell you what I see and am told and then leave it up to you.

Your guardian angel loves you unconditionally and knows you to be wonderful, to be perfect and to be innocent. Your guardian angel wants to help you to reconnect with your innocence because it will make your own life happier and easier and also because if we all reconnected with this innocence, our world would be a much better place. If we all recognised the innocence in everyone else in the world there would be no war or killing. There would be much less hunger and injustice. We would have a much more peaceful world. I am not talking about naivety; rather, I am talking about a pure innocence that allows us to see the good in ourselves and in others. I am not talking about immaturity, rather a maturity that is deepened by the awareness of the innocence of everyone. The more we understand our own and one another’s innocence, the more we grow and the better people we will become.

We have been trivializing angels for some time — turning them into good luck charms rather than acknowledging them as the powerful and important forces they are. In truth, by degrading angels we have been degrading ourselves.

I have no idea why I can see them and others can’t. I am dyslectic and uneducated and have never read a book. The only education I have is the education that God and his angels have given me, but that education is not recognized in this world.

Some of the angels Byrne has written about talking to are those of the Abrahamic religions: for example, Michael, Gabriel, and Elijah. However, she emphasizes that the angels appear to her in forms she would be comfortable with as a Catholic, and that they would appear to people from other cultures and religions in forms that would be comfortable for them. She has said that she has seen Archangel Gabriel dressed as "what we might call today," a biker.

In Love from Heaven, she stated that most people lock the love they have inside them. She writes that it is vital to love oneself, and that one is unable to love others if one does not love oneself.

Byrne states that all religions have access to God, and no person should think theirs better than the others. She maintains that God and the angels would like all religions to worship together, each according to their own understanding, none trying to convert the others. "It needs to become normal for all of us, regardless of our education, our status in life or our method or place of prayer, to come together with open hearts — without any agenda — to pray to God in whatever way feels appropriate to us."

She has talked and written about the importance and power of prayer, and of recognising hope in the world and in everyone's own lives.

=== Views on public matters ===
Inspired by what she says angels have told her, Byrne has expressed views on matters of public concern.

She has made statements on the environment, saying that, "Far too many decisions that affect our environment are tainted by greed and lobbying of special interests. We are all required to stand up and to make sure our leaders at neighbourhood, community, regional, national and international level know we care about this planet and our environment, and will hold them accountable."

The underpinning for activity to protect the environment should be love: "We all need to wake up and be more aware of the beauty and the gifts of nature that surround us. If we do not appreciate and love nature's incredible beauty, there is no way we will be prepared to do what is required to protect it."

Byrne has said that particular attention should be paid to repairing the damage to the ozone layer. Failure to do so will make other challenges such as combating poverty and disease much harder. The means by which this challenge is met are important: "It will not be solved if people are just out for themselves or wish to make unjust profit out of the process."

She has also expressed opposition to fracking in all circumstances. She believes trees should be planted in very large numbers, as a long-term contribution to the environment.

Byrne has written that children have birthrights which should be upheld, among them the rights "to be a child", "to be treated equally", "to have food and water", "to breathe clean air", "to be born into a peaceful world", "to a full education", "to full medical care". To these ends, individuals need to "stand up for children and demand that our government, leaders and international institutions do the right thing by children, and hold these authorities to account if they don't".

== Reception ==
Reaction to Byrne's statement that she sees angels and spirits has been varied, ranging from scepticism and disbelief to belief and endorsement.

In 2014, Byrne met and was endorsed by the theologian Matthew Fox. John L. Esposito, professor of International Relations and Islamic Studies at Georgetown University, said, "A Message of Hope from the Angels offers a message of hope that speaks to the crises and everyday problems that many struggle with in today’s world."

Larry Dossey described her Angels in my Hair as "captivating" and "both a challenge to skeptics and an inspiration to those whose experiences confirm transcendental realities."

== Books ==
- 2008 Angels in my Hair. London: Century. ISBN 1-84-605177-0
- 2010 Stairways to Heaven. London: Coronet. ISBN 1-44-470603-9
- 2012 A Message of Hope from the Angels. London: Coronet. ISBN 1-44-472987-X
- 2014 Love from Heaven. London: Coronet. ISBN 1-44-478632-6
- 2016 The Year With Angels. London: Coronet. ISBN 1-47-364936-6
- 2017 Angels at my Fingertips. London: Coronet. ISBN 1-47-363587-X
- 2018 Prayers from the Heart. London: Coronet. ISBN 1-47-363592-6
- 2020 My Guardian Angel, My Best Friend: Stories for children (illustrations by Aideen Byrne). London: Coronet. ISBN 1-47-363596-9
