= Newton-Wellesley Hospital =

Hospital in Newton, Massachusetts, US

- Mass General Brigham

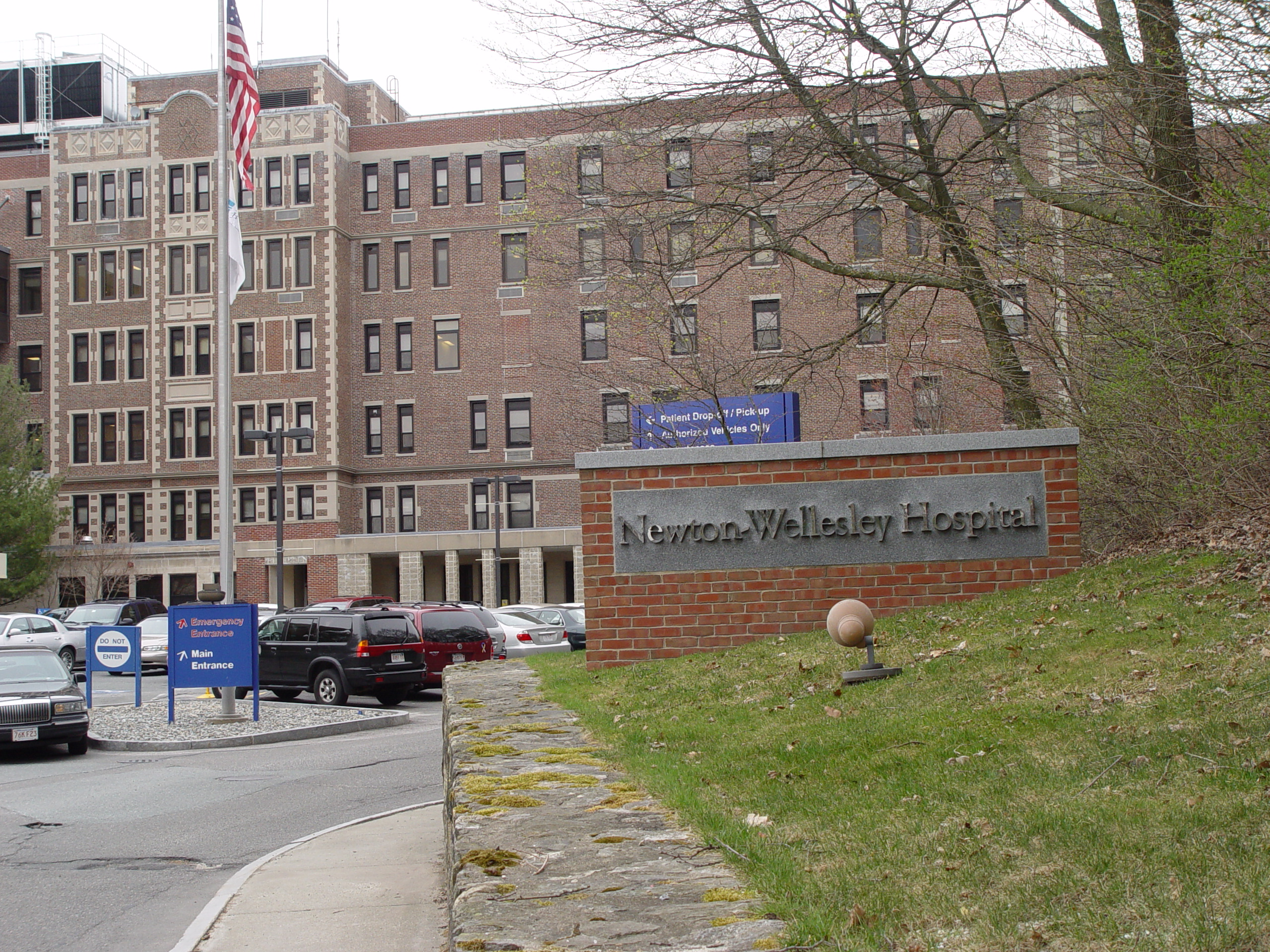
- Newton-Wellesley Hospital

Geography
- Location: 2014 Washington St., Newton, Massachusetts, United States
- Coordinates: 42°19′58.26″N 71°14′46.33″W

Organization
- Type: Nonprofit, Community Teaching
- Affiliated university: Tufts University School of Medicine, Harvard Medical School

Services
- Emergency department: Yes
- Beds: 273

History
- Founded: 1881

Links
- Website: www.nwh.org
- Lists: Hospitals in Massachusetts
- Newton Cottage Hospital Historic District
- U.S. National Register of Historic Places
- U.S. Historic district
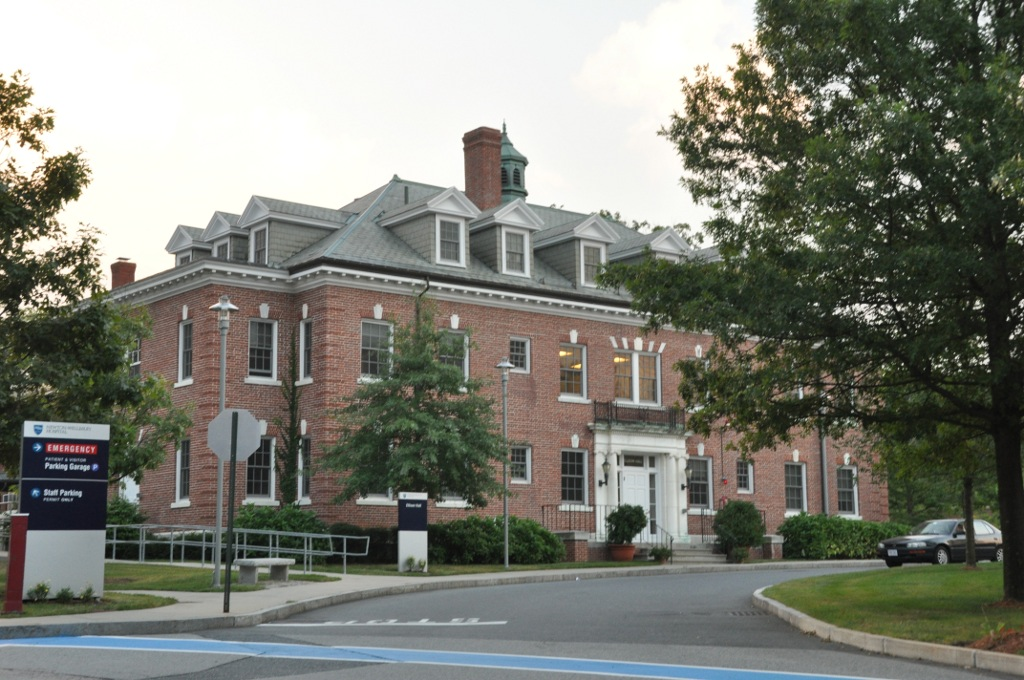
- One of the hospital's historic buildings
- Location: 2014 Washington St., Newton, Massachusetts
- Built: 1894
- Architect: Hartwell & Richardson; Et al.
- Architectural style: Colonial Revival, Tudor Revival, Georgian Revival
- MPS: Newton MRA
- NRHP reference No.: 90000108
- Added to NRHP: February 21, 1990

Newton-Wellesley Hospital (NWH) is a community teaching medical center located in Newton, Massachusetts on Washington Street. It is affiliated with Tufts University School of Medicine and Harvard Medical School. Founded in 1881, part of its campus is listed on the National Register of Historic Places as the Newton Cottage Hospital Historic District.

It is a member of Mass General Brigham, a network founded by Massachusetts General Hospital and Brigham and Women’s Hospital. The hospital offers a range of medical, surgical, and specialty care, including maternity services, a 24-hour emergency department, and orthopedic, critical care, and oncology inpatient units.

== History ==
Newton-Wellesley Hospital, originally called Newton Cottage Hospital, was incorporated in 1881. The idea for the hospital began when a local reverend, George W. Shinn, encouraged the mayor of Newton, Royal M. Pulsifer, to provide health care services for sick members of the community. Nine acres were purchased for the building. The hospital opened its doors on June 5, 1886 and admitted its first patient a week later. As a cottage hospital, Newton-Wellesley was built to serve the local population. It consisted of a complex of buildings, radiating from a central administrative building. Patients were cared for in windowed ward rooms, one story high.

A School of Nursing was established at the hospital in 1888. The first baby was born there in 1890 (by 1965, 50,000 babies had been delivered, including the hospital's first in-vitro baby). Newton-Wellesley acquired its first X-ray machine in 1902, and an electrocardiograph in 1933. In 1910, the outpatient department was opened at the hospital. Most outpatient departments at the time consisted of a doctor and a nurse. But Newton-Wellesley offered a variety of services, each attended by a specialist. The department had an orthopedic service, one of only two in the Boston community. A complex of eleven modestly-scaled buildings (compared to modern hospital facilities), most constructed between 1894 and 1908, were the subject of the 1990 "Newton Cottage Hospital" listing on the National Register of Historic Places. Several of the listed buildings have since been demolished.

In response to the influx of patients resulting from the combination of World War I and the 1918 influenza pandemic, the hospital erected a number of tents and temporary buildings. Patient records began to be kept in 1920, followed in 1924 by the establishment of an official hospital laboratory for bloodwork and urinalyses; the blood bank was first added in 1939. In 1955, the first pacemaker operation at the hospital was performed, followed by the first cardiac catheterization in 1993. The Wikstrom Surgical Center opened in 1993, providing 16 operating rooms, pre-operative and post-anesthesia areas, and a permanent MRI suite.

In 1999, Newton-Wellesley Hospital joined Partners HealthCare, now Mass General Brigham; it affiliated with MassGeneral Hospital for Children in 2001. A number of new centers were created, including the Spine Center (founded by Andrew C. Hecht in 2001), the Waltham Urgent Care Center (2003), and Maxwell Blum Emergency Pavilion (2007) and the Vernon Cancer Center (construction began 2008).

== Facilities and current operations ==
There are 273 available beds and more than 21,000 discharges every year at Newton-Wellesley Hospital. On average, there are 56,000 visits in the emergency room yearly and more than 3,700 babies born. 14,000 surgical cases are seen each year. The hospital employs approximately 2,500 people.

The main campus of Newton-Wellesley is located at 2014 Washington Street, Newton, Massachusetts, near the intersection of Routes 16 & 128 (I-95), one mile south of the Mass. Pike (I-90). The closest MBTA stop is Woodland, two blocks from the hospital on the D (Riverside) Branch of the MBTA Green Line.

An additional urgent care treatment facility was located offsite at 9 Hope Avenue in Waltham, MA; this facility closed permanently on December 31, 2024. Laboratory Services operates offsite locations in Natick, Walpole, Waltham and Weston.

== Hospital rating data ==
The HealthGrades website contains the clinical quality data for Newton-Wellesley Hospital, as of 2018. For this rating section clinical quality rating data and patient safety ratings are presented.

For inpatient conditions and procedures, there are three possible ratings: worse than expected, as expected, better than expected. For this hospital the data for this category is:

- Worse than expected: 2
- As expected: 17
- Better than expected: 4

For patient safety ratings the same three possible ratings are used. For this hospital they are:

- Worse than expected: 1
- As expected: 10
- Better than expected: 2

Percent of patients who would rate this hospital as a 9 or 10: 81%.

Percent of patients nationally who rate hospitals on average a 9 or 10: 69%.

== Ratings ==
NWH has received the Boston Globe's Top Places to Work Award in 2010 and 2011. U.S. News Media & World Report’s 2011-12 Best Hospitals rankings recognized Newton- Wellesley as high performing in Urology. The hospital was designated as an Aetna Institutes™ of Quality for Bariatric Surgery in 2011. Blue Cross Blue Shield of Massachusetts recognized Newton-Wellesley Hospital (NWH) with a 2011 Blue Distinction Designation for demonstrating reliability in delivering spine surgery with better overall outcomes for patients. Newton-Wellesley Hospital's medical oncology partner, New England Hematology/Oncology Associates (NEHOA), became one of the first oncology practices in the nation to be recognized by the Quality Oncology Practice Initiative (QOPI®) Certification Program, an affiliate of the American Society of Clinical Oncology (ASCO). The hospital received the 2011 American Heart Association/American Stroke Association’s Get With The Guidelines® Stroke Gold Plus Achievement Award. Fifty-four physicians affiliated with Newton-Wellesley appeared on the Best Doctors in America® list for 2011-12. The American College of Surgeons National Surgical Quality Improvement Program (ACS NSQIP) recognized Newton-Wellesley Hospital as one of 26 ACS NSQIP participating hospitals in the United States that have achieved exemplary outcomes for surgical patient care. Newton-Wellesley Hospital received The American Heart Association/ American Stroke Association’s 2010 Get With The Guidelines® Triple Gold Performance Achievement Award for achievement in coronary artery disease, stroke and/or heart failure treatment. In 2010, Blue Cross Blue Shield of Massachusetts recognized Newton-Wellesley Hospital with a Blue Distinction® Designation for demonstrating reliability in delivering knee/hip replacement with better overall outcomes for patients. Boston magazine featured Newton-Wellesley Hospital in their 2010 annual "Top Doctors" issue as a top community hospital outside of Boston. The article also features 24 Newton-Wellesley Hospital physicians as top doctors in the state.

== Clinical centers ==
Clinical Centers at Newton-Wellesley include:

- The Auerbach Breast Center
- The Center for Minimally Invasive Gynecologic Surgery
- The Center for Weight Loss Surgery
- The Kaplan Center for Joint Reconstruction Surgery
- The Manton Women's Imaging Center
- The Spine Center
- The Vernon Cancer Center

== Notable births ==
- Actor Jack Lemmon was born in an elevator at Newton-Wellesley Hospital in 1925.
- Matt LeBlanc and B. J. Novak were born at the hospital.

== The early years ==
- The cost to start Newton Cottage Hospital: $3,600 for land; $7,209 to construct the hospital.
- Only 26 patients were cared for in 1886—the first year the hospital was opened.
- Chickens and cows grazed at the hospital, providing fresh dairy for patients and staff. Extensive gardens were also on site.
- The first bequest Newton-Wellesley received was in 1886 for $250 from the estate of Eliza Kendall.
- In 1961, the hospital begins use of electronic paging systems—thanks to the donations raised from a Valentine's Day Ball.

=== Nursing early years ===
- Nursing candidates at Newton Cottage Hospital in 1888 had to be between 23 and 35 years old.
- They were not permitted to talk with any males within the hospital gates.
- Their dress requirements included seersucker gingham with a linen collar and cuffs, a white cap and white apron.
- The School of Nursing closed in 1986 after graduating nearly 3,500 nurses in its 100 years.

== Then and Now ==
- Patients stayed an average of four weeks during the first years at Newton Cottage Hospital. Today, the average patient stay at Newton-Wellesley is less than four days.
- There were three births at the hospital in 1890. Today, there are more than 3,900 births every year at the hospital.
- The hospital was one of approximately 500 hospitals in the nation when it opened. There are 7,500-plus hospitals nationwide today.

== By the Numbers ==
- Newton-Wellesley was the first community hospital in Massachusetts to offer PET/CT scans.
- There are more than 1000 physicians affiliated with Newton-Wellesley Hospital.
- The hospital's Laboratory Services and Pathology Department perform more than 1.3 million lab tests every year.
- In 2012, Newton-Wellesley Hospital had 273 Licensed Beds (not including bassinets), 19,510 Discharges, 4,186 Observations, 3,740 Deliveries, 49,766 Ultrasounds (including inpatient, outpatient, and Waltham), 47,859 Mammograms and Bone Density tests (including inpatient and outpatient), 65,208 X-rays (including inpatient and outpatient), 56,420 Emergency Visits (including inpatient and outpatient; excluding critical care visits), 83,588 Rehabilitation Services visits (including inpatient and outpatient), and 14,338 Surgical cases (including inpatient and outpatient)
- In 2005, the hospital's hundred-year-old Ellison Building, weighing 890 tons, was moved on 28 eight-wheeled dollies to a new location 220 feet away.
- In September 2011 the Newton-Wellesley Hospital Charitable Foundation hosted their second annual HopeWalks to raise money for the Mass General Cancer Center at Newton-Wellesley. HopeWalks raised over $215,000 with 1,000 walkers and 78 teams.

== See also ==
- National Register of Historic Places listings in Newton, Massachusetts
