= Angels in My Hair =

2008 book by Lorna Byrne

- Author: Lorna Byrne
- Publisher: Random House
- Publication date: 2008
- ISBN: 978-1-846-05177-7

Angels in My Hair is an autobiographical book written by Lorna Byrne about her communication with spiritual beings like Angels, souls and God. It is based in Ireland and was published in 2008 by Random House.

== Reception ==
Angels in My Hair is a Sunday Times bestseller and spent 21 weeks at number one in Ireland and has attracted mainly positive reviews. Michelle Stanistreet of the Sunday Express wrote: "Lorna is extraordinary. Whether or not her angels are real." The Irish Times said: "She is, it has to be said, an unusual person, with a calm and peaceful presence. Spending time with her is both challenging and inspirational." The Times in September 2010 asked whether Byrne was responsible for the significant increase in people in Britain who believed in angels - up from 29% to 46%.

Angels in My Hair is translated into 21 languages and published in 47 countries and has sold over half a million copies worldwide. According to WorldCat, the book is held in over 150 libraries. She has appeared on television programmes including BBC Sunday morning live, Fox News The Late Late show and Ireland AM. Lorna Byrne has been extensively interviewed about Angels in My Hair by amongst others BBC Radio 4 Beyond Belief, BBC Radio 2 Steve Wright in the Afternoon, by George Noory for Coast to Coast AM. Newspapers and magazines who have featured Lorna Byrne include The Economist, Die Welt, The Times, The Telegraph.

Lorna's other books include Stairways to Heaven and A Message of Hope from the Angels, which was a Sunday Times Number One Bestseller. Both published by Coronet.
