= Journal of Integrative Medicine =

- Discipline: Integrative medicine
- Language: English
- Edited by: Guang Ji, Chang-quan Ling

Publication details
- Former name: Journal of Chinese Integrative Medicine
- History: 2003-present
- Publisher: Science Press in collaboration with Elsevier (China)
- Frequency: Bimonthly
- Impact factor: 2.446

Standard abbreviations
- ISO 4: J. Integr. Med.

Indexing
- CODEN: JIMOBM
- ISSN: 2095-4964
- OCLC no.: 839641521
- Journal of Chinese Integrative Medicine
- ISSN: 1672-1977

Links
- Journal homepage; Online archive

The Journal of Integrative Medicine is a bimonthly peer-reviewed medical journal covering all aspects of complementary and alternative and integrative medicine. It was established in 2003 as the Journal of Chinese Integrative Medicine and obtained its current title in 2013. It is published by Science Press and is distributed by Elsevier. The Editors-in-Chief are Guang Ji and Chang-quan Ling.

== Integrative and alternative medicine ==
David Gorski has described integrative medicine as an attempt to bring pseudoscience into academic science-based medicine with skeptics such as Gorski and David Colquhoun referring to this with the pejorative term "quackademia". Robert Todd Carroll described Integrative medicine as "a synonym for 'alternative' medicine that, at its worst, integrates sense with nonsense. At its best, integrative medicine supports both consensus treatments of science-based medicine and treatments that the science, while promising perhaps, does not justify" Rose Shapiro has criticized the field of alternative medicine for rebranding the same practices as integrative medicine.

== Abstracting and indexing ==
The journal is abstracted and indexed in Index medicus/MEDLINE/PubMed, Science Citation Index Expanded (SCIE), Excerpta Medica, Chemical Abstracts, JST China, Chinese Science Citation Database (CSCD), and China National Knowledge Infrastructure (CNKI).
