= Salem Hospital (Massachusetts) =

- Mass General Brigham

Geography
- Location: 81 Highland Avenue, Salem, Massachusetts, United States
- Coordinates: 42.511736°N 70.906861°W

Services
- Emergency department: Level III Trauma Center
- Beds: 212

History
- Former name: North Shore Medical Center
- Opened: 1873

Links
- Website: salem.massgeneralbrigham.org
- Lists: Hospitals in Massachusetts

Salem Hospital, formerly known as North Shore Medical Center, is a Level III trauma center located in Salem, Massachusetts. A member of Mass General Brigham since 1996, it offers comprehensive medical and surgical services and includes emergency/trauma departments and a birthplace. It includes Salem Hospital and the Mass General Brigham Healthcare Center in Lynn, as well as outpatient care and urgent care. The Medical Staff includes nearly 800 affiliated physicians representing primary care, family practice and 50 additional sub-specialties. It is affiliated with Tufts University School of Medicine.

Salem Hospital is a general medical and surgical hospital which had 199 licensed beds as of 2023, with plans to expand to 212 by early 2024. The hospital had 19,467 admissions in the latest year for which data are available. It performed 4,409 annual inpatient and 7,955 outpatient surgeries. Its emergency department had 90,149 visits for 2012. A helipad at Salem Hospital is a helicopter transportation hub, with multiple daily flights to hospitals all over Boston.

== Background ==
=== Affiliates ===
Salem Hospital is a member of Mass General Brigham, founded by Brigham and Women’s Hospital and Massachusetts General Hospital. It maintains clinical collaborations with Massachusetts General Hospital, working together to offer advanced inpatient and outpatient care in the community including cancer care, cardiac care, pediatrics, OB/GYN, orthopedics, surgery, and urology services.

North Shore Physicians Group is also affiliated with Salem Hospital. North Shore Physicians Group is a network of multi-specialty and primary care physicians serving individuals and families in 25 North Shore locations.

Brigham and Women's Hospital (BWH, "The Brigham") is the largest hospital of the Longwood Medical and Academic Area in Boston, Massachusetts, United States. It is a teaching affiliate of Harvard Medical School and has 793 beds. With Massachusetts General Hospital, it is one of the two founding members of Mass General Brigham (formerly Partners Healthcare), the largest healthcare provider in Massachusetts.

Massachusetts General Hospital (Mass General or MGH) is a teaching hospital of Harvard Medical School and a biomedical research facility located in the West End neighborhood of Boston, Massachusetts. It is the third oldest general hospital in the United States and the 2nd biggest hospital in New England with 1,057 beds coming in after Yale-New Haven Hospital in Connecticut, which currently has 1,541 beds. Massachusetts General conducts the largest hospital-based research program in the world, with an annual research budget of more than $400 million. It is currently ranked as the #2 hospital in the United States by U.S. News & World Report.

== Other hospitals in the complex ==
Salem Hospital is a 212-bed community teaching hospital that provides adult and pediatric services. The Heart Center has fully integrated cardiac services including angioplasty and advanced cardiac surgery. Surgical services include minimally invasive procedures. Full pediatric services are located on the Salem campus as well.

Mass General for Children at North Shore Medical Center is a pediatric department and pediatric hospital. The name reflects the more than twelve years of clinical collaboration with MassGeneral Hospital for Children (MGHfC).

Mass General/North Shore Center for Outpatient Care is a collaboration with Massachusetts General Hospital. Services include outpatient and minimally invasive surgery, the Mass General/North Shore Cancer Center, cardiac diagnostics, and advanced imaging services.

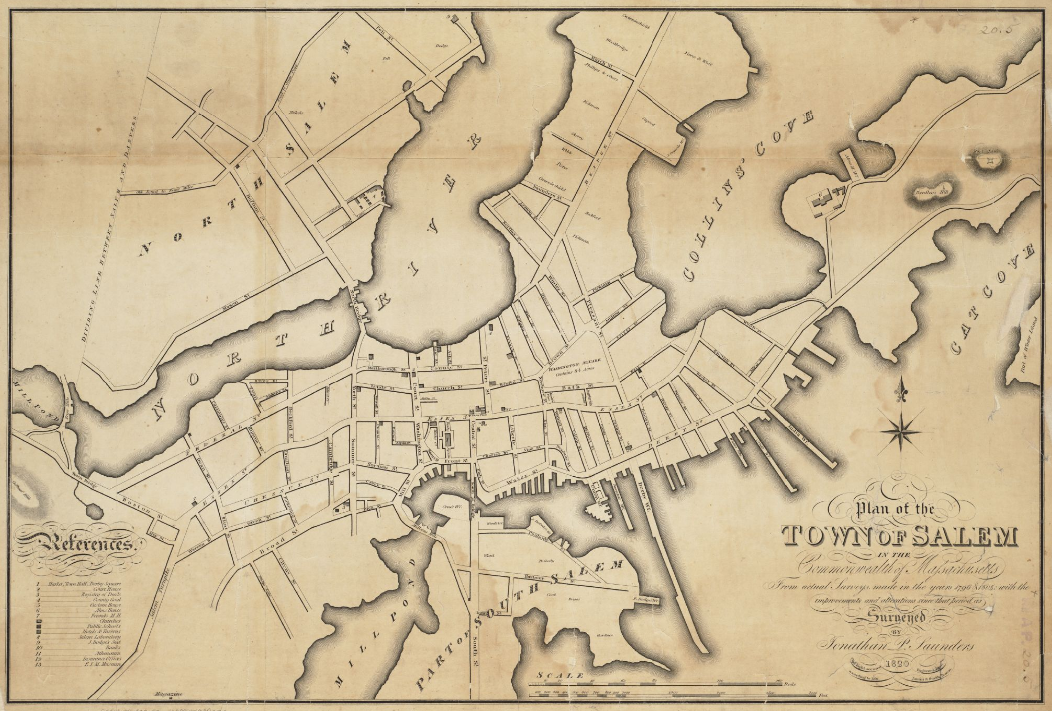
Salem – 1820

== History ==
=== Founding ===
Captain John Bertram (Massachusetts businessman) (1796–1882) lived in Salem, Massachusetts and is the founder of Salem Hospital. In 1873, Captain John Bertram gave a gift of $25,000 in cash, plus a brick mansion on Charter Street to create Salem Hospital. From the original building on Charter Street, Salem Hospital moved to the current location on Highland Avenue in 1917. After John Bertram died in March 1882, his widow donated their home, John Bertram Mansion, a mansion built in the High Style Italianate with brick and brownstone for materials, built at 370 Essex Street and this became the Salem Public Library. In addition, John Bertram House is now a home for the elderly.

=== 2013 renovations and expansions ===
In October 2013, North Shore Medical Center announced a $170 million expansion and renovation project. Construction is expected to be finished by 2017 and will include a brand new emergency department, over 70 private beds and numerous upgrades within the hospital.

== Awards ==
The 23rd Cancer WALK took place on June 23, 2013, at Salem Willows to raise money for North Shore Medical Center’s oncology unit in Salem and the Mass General/North Shore Cancer Center in Danvers. A 2nd Cancer Walk was started in 2011 was the first year that North Shore Medical Center sponsored a Cancer Walk in the City of Salem (2013 is the 4th year).
