= Society for Acupuncture Research =

Medical society based in Winston-Salem, North Carolina, US

The Society for Acupuncture Research is a Winston–Salem, North Carolina–based medical society dedicated to advancing research into acupuncture and related interventions. It was founded in 1993 by Patricia Culliton, Hannah Bradford, and Stephen Birch, and was originally based in Bethesda, Maryland. Its current co-presidents are Vitaly Napadow and Robert Davis.

== See also ==
- The Journal of Alternative and Complementary Medicine
