= Spaulding Rehabilitation Hospital =

- Mass General Brigham

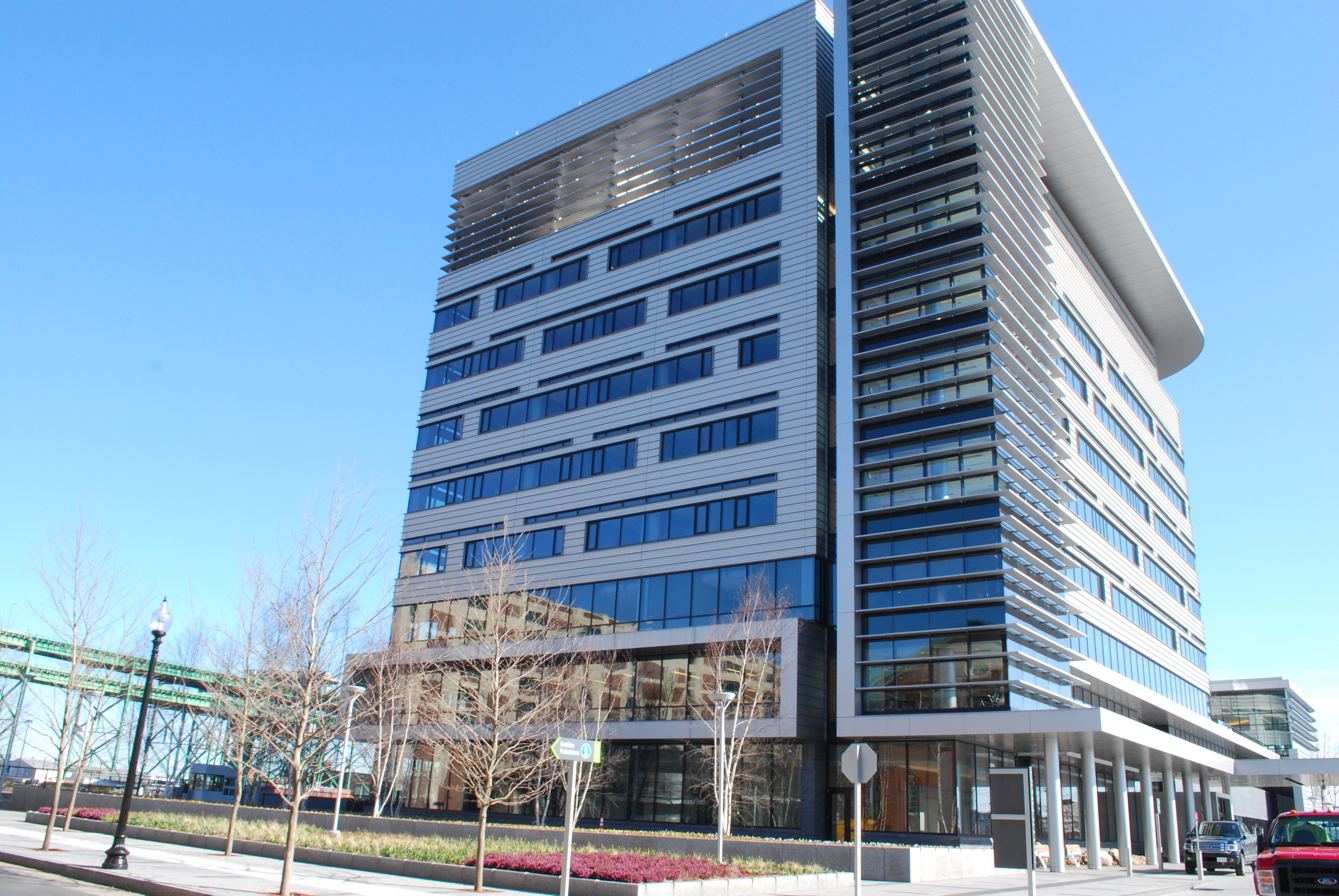
- Spaulding Rehabilitation Hospital in Boston

Geography
- Location: 300 First Avenue (Charlestown Navy Yard), Boston, Massachusetts, United States
- Coordinates: 42°22′44″N 71°2′57″W

Organization
- Type: Specialist
- Affiliated university: Harvard Medical School
- Network: Spaulding Rehabilitation Network

Services
- Standards: Joint Commission
- Emergency department: No
- Beds: 132
- Speciality: Rehabilitation

History
- Founded: 1971; 55 years ago

Links
- Website: www.newspauldinghospital.com spauldingrehab.org
- Lists: Hospitals in Massachusetts

The Spaulding Rehabilitation Hospital is a 132-bed rehabilitation teaching hospital located in Boston, Massachusetts. It is the official teaching hospital for Harvard Medical School’s Department of Physical Medicine and Rehabilitation and the main campus of the Spaulding Rehabilitation Network. The hospital is a member of Partners Continuing Care under Mass General Brigham, a non-profit organization that owns several hospitals in Massachusetts.

== Reputation ==
Spaulding Rehabilitation Hospital has been the only hospital in New England to be continuously ranked by the U.S. News & World Report in its Best Hospitals Survey since 1995. In 2018, the hospital was ranked #2.

== History ==
Spaulding Rehabilitation Hospital was founded in 1971 as the Massachusetts Rehabilitation Hospital. It was named after Josiah Spaulding, a founder, after his death in 1983. The former location was in the West End of Boston, located behind North Station at 125 Nashua Street.

== Redevelopment ==
Its new 300,000 sq. ft, $220 million facility is located on Parcel 6 in the Charlestown Navy Yard and opened for service on April 27, 2013.

== Spaulding Rehabilitation Network ==
The Spaulding Rehabilitation Network includes:

- Spaulding Rehabilitation Hospital - Main campus
- Spaulding Rehabilitation Hospital Cape Cod -Formerly Rehabilitation Hospital of the Cape and Islands
- Spaulding Hospital Cambridge - Long-term care facility
- Spaulding Hospital North Shore - Long-term care facility
- Spaulding Nursing and Therapy Center North End
- Spaulding Nursing and Therapy Center West Roxbury
- Clark House at Fox Village - skilled nursing facility
- Twenty three outpatient sites throughout the Greater Boston area.
