= MANTIS Database =

Index of biomedical journal articles

The MANTIS Database (Manual, Alternative and Natural Therapy Index System) is an index of English-language and selected other-language biomedical journal articles. The database has a primary focus on chiropractic, osteopathic and manual medicine, although it includes citations and abstracts from all alternative medicine disciplines. Each record within the MANTIS Database contains a complete citation, the language of the abstract, the language of the article, and the headings and subheadings which describe the article. Approximately 70% of the references include abstracts. The database is indexed using standard Medical Subject Headings (MeSH). This includes the use of headings, subheadings, and check tags.

MANTIS is available through the Web by ChiroACCESS, HealthIndex, Ovid Technologies and ProQuest (Dialog and DataStar).
