= Benjamin Kligler =

American physician

Benjamin E. "Ben" Kligler is an American academic physician and researcher who has been active in leading integrative medicine initiatives for over 20 years. He is a Professor in the Department of Family and Medicine and Community Health at the Icahn School of Medicine at Mount Sinai, as well as the former Vice Chair and research director of the Mount Sinai Beth Israel Department of Integrative Medicine and the director of the Beth Israel Fellowship Program in Integrative Medicine. He is also the co-editor-in-chief of the integrative medicine journal Explore: The Journal of Science and Healing.

Kligler received his medical degree from the Boston University School of Medicine, after which he completed his residency in family medicine at Montefiore Medical Center. In May 2000, he became the founding medical director of Mount Sinai Beth Israel's Continuum Center for Health and Healing, an integrative medicine practice which shut down in the fall of 2016. In March 2016, he was named as the founding national director of the Integrative Health Coordinating Center at the Veterans Health Administration.

Kligler has researched the effectiveness of multiple alternative medicine treatments, including yoga and acupuncture.
