= Integrative Cancer Therapies =

- Discipline: Oncology
- Language: English
- Edited by: Keith I. Block

Publication details
- History: 2002-present
- Publisher: SAGE Publications
- Frequency: Quarterly
- Impact factor: 2.657 (2017)

Standard abbreviations
- ISO 4: Integr. Cancer Ther.

Indexing
- ISSN: 1534-7354 (print); 1552-695X (web)
- LCCN: 2003209158
- OCLC no.: 46736454

Links
- Journal homepage; Online access; Online archive

Integrative Cancer Therapies is a peer-reviewed medical journal focusing on complementary and alternative and integrative medicine in the care for and treatment of patients with cancer. Therapies like diets and lifestyle modifications, as well as experimental vaccines and chemotherapy are the subject of this journal. It was established in 2002 and is published by SAGE Publications. The editor-in-chief is Keith I. Block (University of Illinois at Chicago).

A study published in the March 2006 issue, Diagnostic Accuracy of Canine Scent Detection in Early-and Late-Stage Lung and Breast Cancers by McCulloch et al., garnered widespread media attention. The study presented evidence that a dog's scenting ability can distinguish people with both early and late stage lung and breast cancers from healthy controls.

== Abstracting and indexing ==
The journal is abstracted and indexed in Scopus and the Social Sciences Citation Index. According to the Journal Citation Reports, its 2017 impact factor is 2.657, ranking it 5th out of 27 journals in the category "Integrative & Complementary Medicine" and 136th out of 222 journals in the category "Oncology".
