= Institute of Noetic Sciences =

American non-profit parapsychological research institute

Coordinates: 38.1753°N 122.6055°W

- Abbreviation: IONS
- Formation: June 1973; 53 years ago
- Founder: Edgar Mitchell
- Headquarters: Novato, California, US
- Website: https://noetic.org

The Institute of Noetic Sciences (Note: /noʊˈɛtɪk/) (IONS) is an American non-profit parapsychological research institute. It was co-founded in 1973 by former astronaut Edgar Mitchell, the sixth man to walk on the Moon, along with investor Paul N. Temple and others interested in psychic phenomena, in order to encourage and conduct research on noetics and human potentials.

The Institute conducts research on topics such as psychic abilities, channeling, mind matter interaction, energy healing, intention, consciousness, and spontaneous remission. They have a long history of studying meditation, alternative healing practices, consciousness-based healthcare, spirituality, human potential, psychokinesis and survival of consciousness after bodily death. The Institute maintains a free database, available on the Internet, with citations to more than 6,500 articles about whether physical and mental health benefits might be connected to meditation and yoga.

IONS is now headquartered in Novato, California, after previously being situated on a 200-acre (81 ha) campus in Petaluma that included offices, a research laboratory and a retreat center. Researchers associated with it include Dean Radin, Helané Wahbeh and Rupert Sheldrake.

== History ==
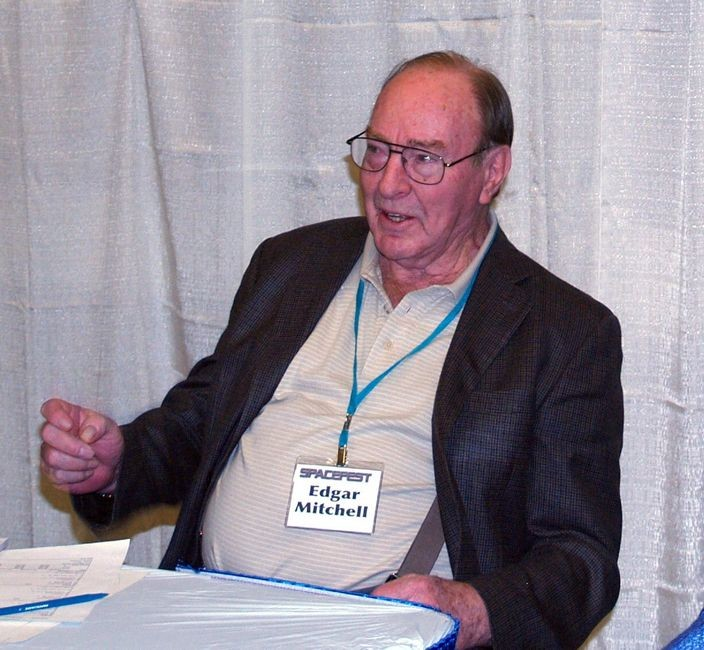
Edgar Mitchell, co-founder of the Institute of Noetic Sciences

Edgar Mitchell has reported that on his return to Earth, after the 1971 Apollo 14 Moon landing, he had an experience comparable to savikalpa samādhi. He also says that he conducted ESP experiments with earthbound friends during spaceflight. In 1973, along with investor Paul N. Temple and some others, Mitchell co-founded the Institute of Noetic Sciences (IONS). It was founded as a 501(c)(3) non-profit organization in 1973. Willis Harman served as president from 1975 until his death in 1997.

The word noetic derives from the Greek nous, meaning "mind or ways of knowing." Writing in The Huffington Post, the Institute's director of research pointed to philosopher William James' 1902 definition of the word as:

... states of insight into depths of truth unplumbed by the discursive intellect. They are illuminations, revelations, full of significance and importance, all inarticulate though they remain; and as a rule they carry with them a curious sense of authority. ...

The Institute figures prominently in The Lost Symbol, a 2009 work of fiction by best-selling author Dan Brown. Twitter postings on the day before the book's release led Institute director Marilyn Schlitz to purchase the book and read it in one sitting. She told NPR that she found ten experiments conducted by the real-world Institute referred to in Brown's fictional account. NPR reported that after its publication "traffic to [the institute's] website ... increased twelvefold", applications for membership increased and "journalists from places like Dateline NBC — not to mention NPR ..." were seeking interviews with Schlitz. "Noetic science" remains a major plot point in Brown's 2025 novel The Secret of Secrets.

The annual Linda G. O'Bryant Noetic Sciences Research Prize awards $100,000 to groundbreaking scientists.

== Research ==
Projects sponsored by the Institute include a bibliography on the physical and psychological effects of meditation and yoga, and a spontaneous remission bibliography. The Institute has also conducted a number of parapsychological studies into extra-sensory perception, lucid dreaming, telekinesis, and presentiment.

According to The Roanoke Times, the Institute is "... devoted to exploring psychic phenomena and the role of consciousness in the cosmos."

The Roanoke Times also noted that co-founder Mitchell's assertions "... have often been criticized by skeptics." Told "your research goes into a number of territories that are regarded with skepticism in some circles", Mitchell replied:

That's what's fun about it. We're breaking down barriers and finding things. That's what science is all about: new discovery. ... There's nothing that we have done or have demonstrated that doesn't have good science behind it. Skeptics be damned.

The Institute is listed on Stephen Barrett's Quackwatch website, for its research on fringe topics.

== Documentaries and publications ==
In 1994, TBS broadcast a three-part, six-hour documentary based on work at the Institute, entitled The Heart of Healing and narrated by actress Jane Seymour.

Since 2009, the Institute has published a semi-annual bulletin, The Noetic Post. From 2003 to 2009, it published a quarterly magazine, Shift: At the Frontiers of Consciousness.

IONS continues to advance the field of scientific discovery through regularly publishing peer-reviewed papers in established journals. A comprehensive list can be viewed at https://noetic.org/science/publications/

== See also ==
- Dean Radin
