= Journal of Alternative and Complementary Medicine =

- Discipline: Alternative medicine
- Language: English
- Edited by: John Weeks

Publication details
- History: 1995–present
- Publisher: Mary Ann Liebert, Inc.
- Frequency: Monthly
- Impact factor: 2.3 (2023)

Standard abbreviations
- ISO 4: J. Altern. Complement. Med.

Indexing
- CODEN: JACPFP
- ISSN: 1075-5535 (print); 1557-7708 (web)
- LCCN: 95660807
- OCLC no.: 53406436

Links
- Journal homepage; Online archive

The Journal of Alternative and Complementary Medicine is a monthly peer-reviewed medical journal covering alternative medicine published by Mary Ann Liebert. It was established in 1995 and is the official journal of the Society for Acupuncture Research. The editor-in-chief is John Weeks, who succeeded the founding editor, Kim A. Jobst.

== Abstracting and indexing ==
The journal is abstracted and indexed in:

- CAB Abstracts
- CINAHL
- Current Contents/Clinical Medicine
- Index Medicus/MEDLINE/PubMed
- Embase/Excerpta Medica
- Mantis database
- PsycINFO
- Science Citation Index
- Scopus

According to the Journal Citation Reports, the journal has a 2023 impact factor of 2.3.

== Reception ==
In 2005 the BBC used a report published by the journal as the basis of a story claiming that homeopathy was effective for some patients. The article contradicted the findings of a study that had recently appeared in The Lancet, reporting that homeopathy was ineffective. The methodology of the article in the Journal of Alternative and Complementary Medicine was criticized by pharmacologist David Colquhoun on his blog, saying that its questionnaire-based approach was "not really research at all" and that the published conclusion drawn from it was "quite ludicrous". In his view, "papers like this do not add to human knowledge, they detract from it". Quackwatch has included the journal on its list of "nonrecommended periodicals", characterizing it as "fundamentally flawed".

The Journal of Alternative and Complementary Medicine is included in the Brandon/Hill listing of books and journals recommended for a small medical library. The Osher Collaborative for Integrative Medicine, which includes Harvard University, Karolinska Institutet, Northwestern University, Vanderbilt University, University of California at San Francisco, University of Miami, and the University of Washington, has a partnership with the journal to publish regular invited commentaries as of February 2017.

== See also ==
- Evidence-based medicine
- Evidence-based practice
