= Mass General Brigham =

Health care system based in Greater Boston, Massachusetts

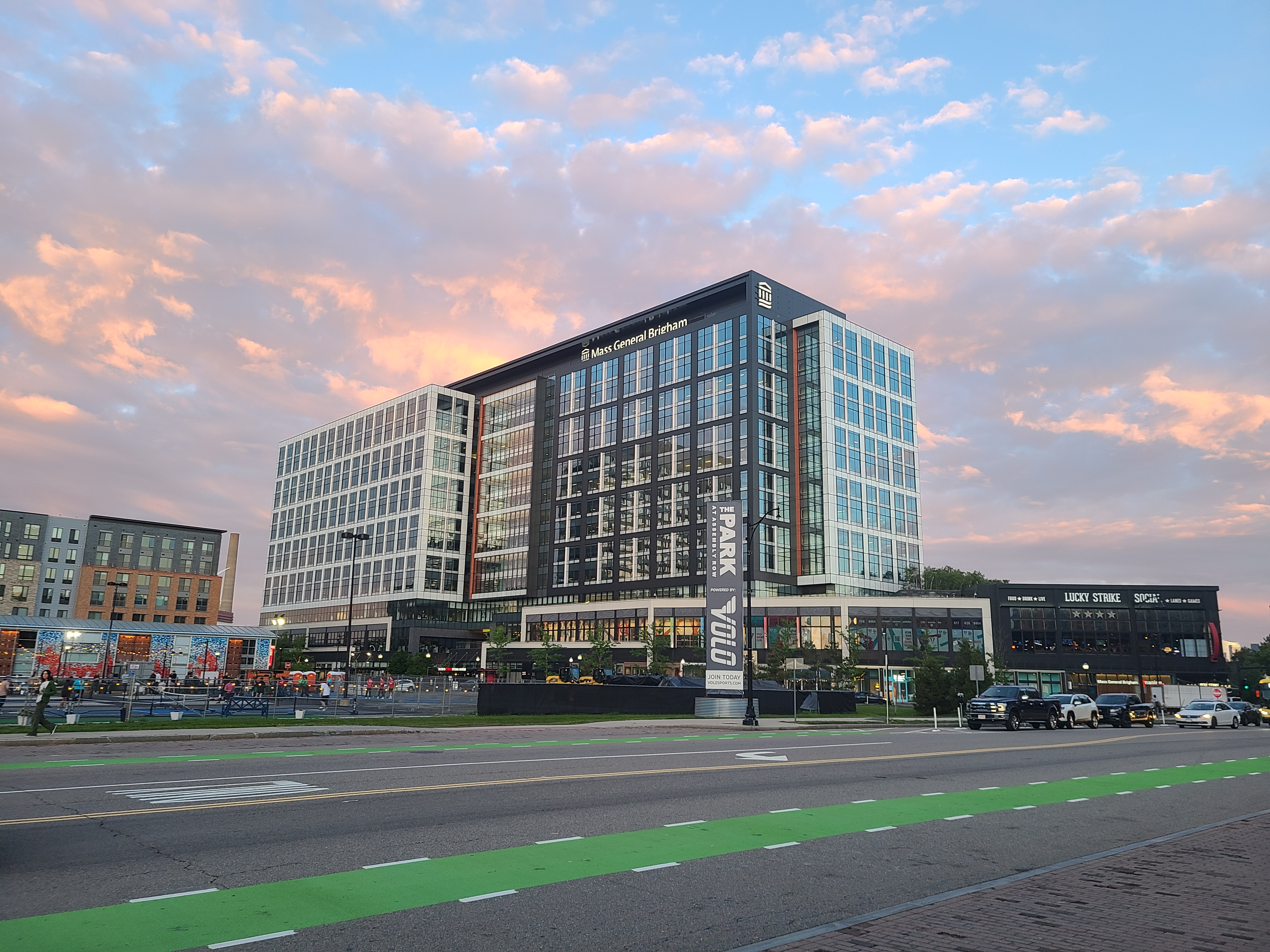
- MGB's office campus at Assembly Square in Somerville, Massachusetts
- Abbreviation: MGB
- Formation: 1994
- Type: Non-profit organization
- Headquarters: Prudential Center; 800 Boylston Street, 11th Floor; Boston, Massachusetts, U.S.
- Coordinates: 42.347414°N 71.081904°W
- Services: Healthcare
- Members: Massachusetts General Hospital; Brigham and Women's Hospital; Brigham and Women's Faulkner Hospital; Cooley Dickinson Hospital; Mass Eye and Ear; Martha's Vineyard Hospital; McLean Hospital; Nantucket Cottage Hospital; Newton-Wellesley Hospital; Salem Hospital
- President & CEO: Anne Klibanski
- Chief of Staff: Margaret S. Norton
- Affiliations: Harvard University; Harvard Medical School
- Revenue: $22.6 billion (2024)
- Staff: ~82,000 (2023)
- Website: massgeneralbrigham.org

Mass General Brigham (MGB) (formerly Partners HealthCare) is an American not-for-profit integrated health care system based in Somerville, Massachusetts. MGB is the largest private employer in Massachusetts, and through its member institutions engages in medical fields such as patient care, research, and education. The system's annual revenue was $20.6 billion in 2024. The system provides clinical care through two academic hospitals, three specialty hospitals, seven community hospitals, home care services, a health insurance plan, and a network of specialty practices, urgent care facilities, and outpatient clinics/surgical centers.

== History ==
Mass General Brigham was founded by the academic medical centers (AMCs) which give it its name: Massachusetts General Hospital (colloquially referred to as "Mass General") and Brigham and Women's Hospital ("the Brigham"). Both hospitals were founded in the early 1800s, are based in Boston, and serve as major teaching hospitals of Harvard Medical School.

In 1994, fueled by economic and political pressure to cut costs on patient care and health care education, the two hospitals merged to create a new parent corporation: Partners HealthCare ("Partners"). The two entities continued to operate largely independently, and remained competitors in multiple areas, until 2019.

In 2015, Partners launched an electronic health record (EHR) system, allowing doctors, nurses, and other caregivers easier access patients' medical history. The effort computerized millions of health records across the system, creating one record for each Partners patient, allowing information to be more easily shared among caregivers.

In 2016, the system moved to their current headquarters in Somerville's Assembly Row. The building allowed Mass General Brigham to merge 14 other offices.

In 2019, 25 years after the founding of Partners, the health system integrated the organization under the new name "Mass General Brigham".

In 2024, Mass General Brigham began integrating clinical departments across Massachusetts General Hospital and Brigham and Women’s Hospital and to establish disease-focused institutes spanning the system.

== Board of Directors ==
The system's current Board of Directors consists of the following members:

Executive Committee of the Board

- Scott M. Sperling (chairman) – co-chief executive officer at Thomas H. Lee Partners
- John Fish – CEO of Suffolk Construction Company
- Jonathan Kraft – president of The Kraft Group

Board Members

- Robert Atchinson – co-founder of Adage Capital Management
- Marc Casper – chairman/president/CEO of Thermo Fisher Scientific
- Yolonda Colson – chief for the Division of Thoracic Surgery at Massachusetts General Hospital
- Zara Cooper – Brigham & Women's Hospital, assoc professor of Surgery at Harvard Medical School
- Anne Finucane – vice chair of Bank of America, board chair of Bank of America Europe.
- Benjamin Gomez – head of capital markets at BNP Paribas Real Estate Spain
- Tiffany Gueye – senior advisor at Blue Meridian Partners
- Susan Hockfield – professor of neuroscience and President Emerita at MIT
- Albert A. Holman, III – founder and president of Chestnut Partners, Inc
- David W. Ives – former chairman, Northshore International Insurance Services, Inc
- Anne Klibanski, MD – president & CEO of Mass General Brigham
- Carl J. Martignetti – president of Martignetti Companies
- Nitin Nohria – former dean of Harvard Business School
- Diane B. Patrick – senior counsel at Ropes & Gray
- Phillip Ragon –founder/owner/CEO of InterSystems Corporation
- Pamela Reeve – former CEO and current chair of multiple publicly traded & non-profit companies
- Paula Ness Speers – partner and managing director, Health Advances
- James D. Taiclet – president & CEO of Lockheed Martin
- Alexander L. Thorndike – president of Choate Investment Advisors
- Carol Vallone – board chair at McLean Hospital, advisory director at Berkshire Partners

== Composition ==
Current members of Mass General Brigham include:

- Brigham and Women's Hospital (founding member)
- Brigham and Women's Faulkner Hospital (acquired in 1998)
- Cooley Dickinson Hospital (acquired in 2013)
- Martha's Vineyard Hospital (acquired in 2006)
- Massachusetts Eye and Ear (acquired in 2018)
- Massachusetts General Hospital (founding member)
- Mass General Brigham Health Plan (acquired in 2011 as Neighborhood HealthPlan, named AllWays Health Partners from 2019–2021)
- Mass General Brigham Healthcare at Home
- McLean Hospital (founded by MGH)
- Mass General Brigham University of Health Professions (founded by MGH)
- Nantucket Cottage Hospital (acquired in 2006)
- Newton-Wellesley Hospital (acquired in 1999)
- Salem Hospital (acquired in 1996, named North Shore Medical Center from 1993–2021)
- Spaulding Rehabilitation Network (acquired by MGH in 1983, named Massachusetts Rehabilitation Hospital from 1970–1983)
- Wentworth-Douglass Hospital (acquired in 2017)

=== Affiliated Organizations ===
- Dana–Farber Cancer Institute
- Ophthalmic Consultants of Boston

== Nobel Laureates ==
There are at least 22 Nobel Prize winners affiliated with Mass General Brigham institutions.

- Herbert L. Abrams (1985)
- Baruj Benacerraf (1980)
- J. Michael Bishop (1989)
- Michael S. Brown (1985)
- Eric Chivian (1985)
- Carl F. Cori (1947)
- Jennifer A. Doudna (2020)
- Gerald Edelman (1972)
- Joseph L. Goldstein (1985)
- William G. Kaelin Jr. (2019)
- Fritz Lipmann (1953)
- Bernard Lown (1985)
- George R. Minot (1934)
- James Muller (1985)
- Ferid Murad (1998)
- William P. Murphy (1934)
- Joseph E. Murray (1990)
- Ralph Steinman (2011)
- Jack W. Szostak (2009)
- E. Donnall Thomas (1990)
- Gary Ruvkun (2024)
- George Whipple (1934)

== Innovations and ventures ==
Mass General Brigham is the largest hospital system-based research enterprise in America, with an annual research budget exceeding $2 billion. It is the top system for National Institutes of Health (NIH) funding in the world, receiving $1.04 billion from NIH in 2022.

The system's funding for research has grown from $1.5 billion in 2012 to $2.3 billion in 2023, with nearly 2/3 of the funds coming from outside of Massachusetts. Research revenues in 2022 were $2.2 billion. In 2023, the system said it had over 2,700 ongoing clinical trials, focused on accelerating new treatments and therapies. Among the system's recent innovations: Visudyne for macular degeneration, Enbrel for rheumatoid arthritis, Eloctate and Alprolix for hemophilia, Entyvio for crohn's disease, and total joint replacements such as Durasul, Longevity, E1, and Vicacit-E.

== Controversies and challenges ==
In May 2000, CEO Dr. Samuel Thier and William C. Van Faasen, CEO of Blue Cross Blue Shield of Massachusetts—the state's biggest health insurer—agreed to a deal that raised insurance costs all across Massachusetts. They agreed that Van Faasen would substantially increase insurance payments to Mass General Brigham doctors and hospitals, largely correcting the underpayments of the previous 10 years. However, Partners issued a statement saying that Thier pledged only that he would treat all insurers equally. According to Boston Globe investigative journalists, Blue Cross and other insurers increased the rate they paid Mass General Brigham by 75 percent between 2000 and 2008, though CEO James J. Mongan argued insurance rates in Massachusetts have gone up at roughly the same rate as the national average.

In 2013, Mass General Brigham's plan to take over 378-bed South Shore Hospital in Weymouth was reviewed due to fears that the expansion plan is anticompetitive, a conduct Mass General Brigham had been accused of over the past four years in other cases. In 2015, the system abandoned their plans to invest $200 million into the hospital.

In April 2017, the United States District Court for the District of Massachusetts announced that Partners HealthCare System and one of its hospitals, Brigham and Women's Hospital, agreed to pay a $10 million fine to resolve allegations that a stem cell research lab fraudulently obtained federal grant funding. Federal prosecutors commended the Brigham for disclosing allegations of fraudulent research at the lab and for taking steps to prevent future recurrences of such conduct.

In May 2017, Partners announced they would be cutting more than $600 million in expenses over the next three years in an effort to control higher costs and to become more efficient. The cost-cutting initiative was called Partners 2.0, and the plan looked to reduce costs in research, care delivery, revenue collection, and supply chain. The plan began on October 1, 2017 and eliminated jobs. The company lost $108 million in 2016, but was profitable in 2017 despite industry turmoil.

In February 2018, Partners announced that 100 coders would have their jobs outsourced to India in a cost saving move. This was all part of the non-profit hospital and physicians network's three-year plan to reduce $500 million to $800 million in overhead costs. CEO Dr. David Torchiana said the job cuts were a financial necessity, adding that most sectors outsource call centers and back-office functions.

During the SARS-CoV-2 pandemic, Partners HealthCare, who reported operating income of $484 million (3.5% operating margin) in fiscal year 2019, refused hazard pay to its healthcare workers despite lack of proper PPE. However, they did not layoff or furlough any employees during the pandemic, while cutting executive salaries. The system explained it does not calibrate pay and benefits based upon patients' conditions, because a core part of its mission is delivering the same high-quality care to all patients regardless of the severity of their condition. Partners also provided employees with pay and benefits for those unable to work due to COVID-related illness, eight weeks of pay for those temporarily without work, and hotel rooms for employees.

Mass General Brigham reported a loss of operations of $432 million (−2.6% operating margin) in fiscal year 2022 due to historic cost inflation, significant workforce shortages, and a worsening capacity crisis. Many health care systems and hospitals nationwide are experiencing the worst year financially since the start of the COVID-19 pandemic. In response, the system announced its plan for a long-term sustainable future, which includes the following initiatives: Advancing integration to improve patient care and identify efficiencies, addressing the labor shortage by building workforce pipelines, and reducing expenses.

=== 2026 nursing strike ===
In July 2026, after contract negotiations stalled over wage increases, MGB faced the largest coordinated strike of healthcare workers in Massachusetts history. Over 4,000 nurses at Brigham and Women's Hospital held a one-day strike and 465 MGB Home Care clinicians struck separately over a longer period. MGB responded to the BWH strike with a four-day lockout and staffed the hospital with more than 1,200 temporary traveling nurses during the dispute. The union representing the workers, the Massachusetts Nurses Association, criticized MGB's wage offers relative to the system's financial position and to executive compensation, including CEO Anne Klibanski's pay, which rose from $8.4 million in fiscal year 2024 to approximately $9.2 million in fiscal year 2025. As of August 2026, MGB and the MNA had not reached new contracts covering the BWH nurses or Home Care clinicians.

== See also ==
- Partners Harvard Medical International
- Steward Health Care System
