= Iris Bell =

American psychologist and alternative medicine researcher

- Occupations: Psychiatrist; Researcher; Professor
- Known for: research on multiple chemical sensitivity and homeopathy

Academic background
- Education: Harvard University (AB); Stanford University School of Medicine (MD); Stanford University (PhD)

Academic work
- Discipline: Psychiatrist
- Main interests: alternative and integrative medicine
- Notable works: Getting Whole, Getting Well: Healing Holistically from Chronic Illness

Iris Roberta Bell is an American psychiatrist, professor, author and alternative medicine researcher. She is known for studying multiple chemical sensitivity and homeopathy. Bell is a longstanding environmental illness advocate, and developed the Arizona Integrative Outcomes Scale, which aims to allow patients to measure their emotional well-being. Bell has published over 140 professional papers and book chapters and has served as an editorial board member for several journals. She lives in Tucson, Arizona.

== Education ==
Bell attended undergraduate school at Harvard University and graduated magna cum laude with a bachelor's degree in biology. She received her PhD in neuro- and biobehavioral sciences from Stanford University in 1977 and her medical degree in 1980. In 1984, Bell completed her psychiatry internship and residency at the University of California-San Francisco. She is board certified in psychiatry, nationally certified in biofeedback and holds a license to practice homeopathy and integrated medicine in Arizona.

== Career ==
Bell formerly served as a faculty member at Harvard Medical School and the University of California-San Francisco. She was also director of an NIH-funded T32 training grant at the University of Arizona College of Medicine for multidisciplinary pre- and postdoctoral fellows to study complementary and alternative medicine research methodologies. She is professor emeritus of family and community medicine at the University of Arizona and holds research faculty appointments at Bastyr University, the Southwest College of Naturopathic Medicine and the American Medical College of Homeopathy. She is also a fellow of the American College of Nutrition.

Bell's research focuses on integrative health care and she has received multiple grants from the National Institutes of Health (NIH) to research homeopathy. Her recent research focuses on the nanoparticles of homeopathic medicine and the effect of alternative medicine on all of the parts that make up an individual person.
