= Wentworth-Douglass Hospital =

Hospital in New Hampshire, US

- Mass General Brigham

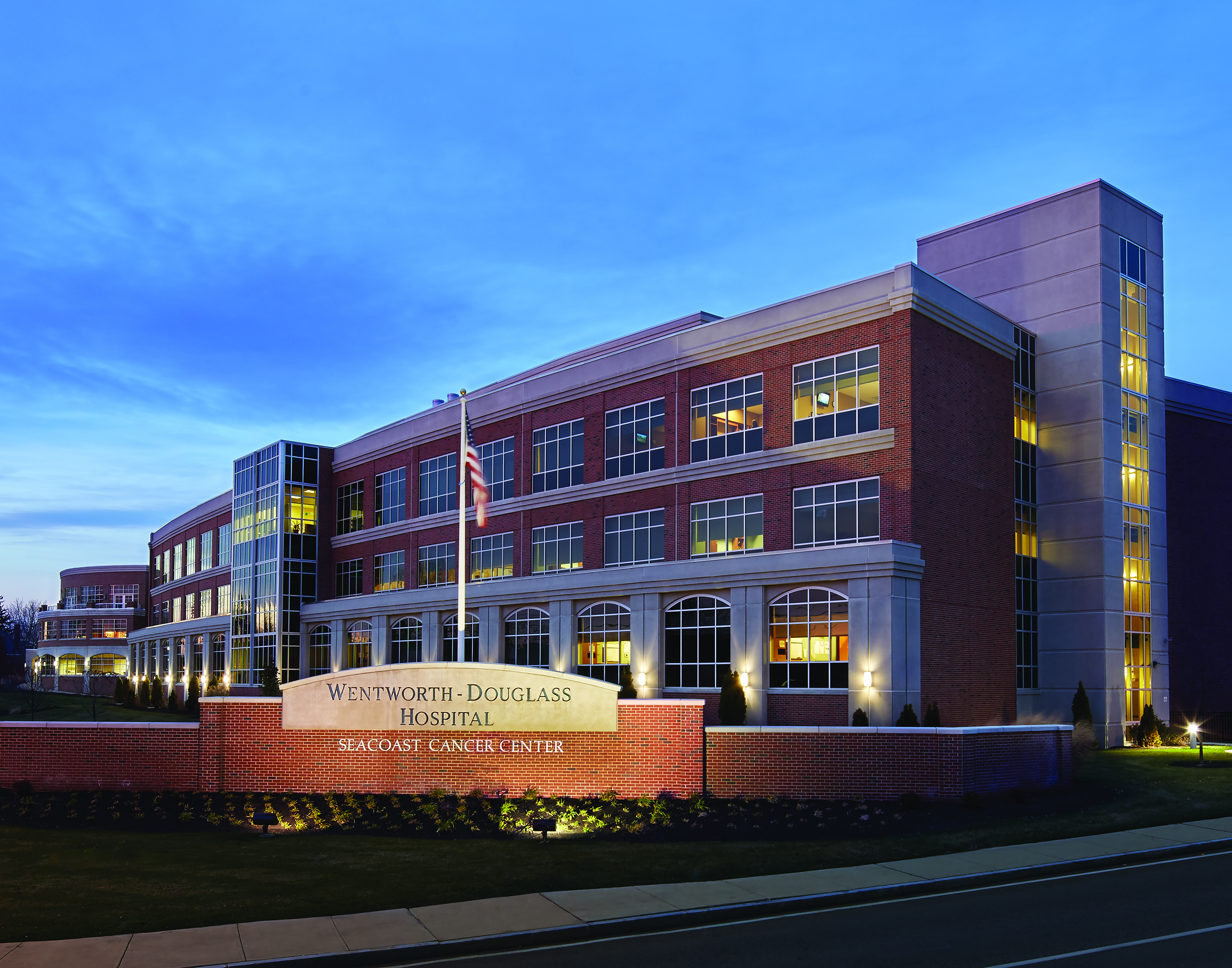

Geography
- Location: 789 Central Ave, Dover, New Hampshire, United States
- Coordinates: 43.2125°N 70.8729°W

Organization
- Care system: Private
- Type: Medical

Services
- Emergency department: Level III Trauma Center
- Beds: 178 (Main Campus)

Helipads
- Helipad: FAA LID: NH56
Number	Length		Surface
Number	ft	m	Surface
H1	60x60	18x18	Concrete

History
- Founded: 1906

Links
- Website: wdhospital.org
- Lists: Hospitals in the United States

Wentworth-Douglass Hospital (known colloquially as WDH) is a not-for-profit, acute care hospital, and 501(c)(3) charitable health care organization located in Dover, New Hampshire.

== Facilities and current operations ==
The 178-bed, Magnet-recognized, community hospital is certified as a Level III Adult and Pediatric Trauma center. The hospital is located in the Seacoast region of New Hampshire and Southern Maine.

Wentworth-Douglass is a member of Mass General Brigham, a health care system founded by Massachusetts General Hospital and Brigham and Women’s Hospital. The hospital offers a range of medical, surgical, and specialty care, including a 24-hour Emergency Department.

The organization also includes primary and specialty provider practices and clinic sites, multiple express (urgent care), and prompt care (primary care) facilities, an ambulatory surgery center, several medical office buildings, The Works Family Health and Fitness Center, and the Wentworth-Douglass Foundation.

The hospital is home to a number of specialty clinical centers, with locations in Dover and Portsmouth, including: The Seacoast Cancer Center, The Center for Heart Health, Center for Orthopedics & Sports Medicine, Women & Children’s Center, Center for Neurosciences, and Center for Weight Management & Bariatric Surgery

Mass General for Children (MGfC) also provides the hospital with pediatric specialty services

== Additional locations ==
- Portsmouth Outpatient Center. Located on the Pease International Tradeport in Portsmouth, New Hampshire, the center offers Primary Care, Specialty Care and Walk-in Care.
- Lee Outpatient Center. Located in Lee, New Hampshire, the center provides Primary Care, an Express Care location, laboratory services, and imaging.
- Dover Outpatient Center. Located on Members Way, the center offers Primary Care, Specialty Care, laboratory services, imaging and Walk-In Prompt Care.
- Wentworth-Douglass Express Care. Located in Dover and Lee, the hospital-based centers offer Walk-in Urgent Care.
- Wentworth Health Partners. WHP is a multi-specialty group practice affiliated with Wentworth-Douglass, including more than 12 Primary Care practices and 23 Specialty Care practices.
- The Works Family Health & Fitness Center. Located in Somersworth, NH, The Works is an 80,000-plus square foot multipurpose wellness and fitness center.

== History ==
Wentworth-Douglass Hospital was conceived as a 30-bed hospital on March 15, 1904, when the Dover City Council accepted $100,000 in trust of a legacy from the late Arioch Wentworth for a hospital to be called the Wentworth.

The hospital opened on August 30, 1906. The Wentworth Hospital consisted of three cottage-type buildings connected by corridors - the Men's Ward, Women's Ward, and Nurse's Home and administrative building. It was located at the northern base of Garrison Hill in Dover. All that remains today of the original buildings is a stone wall along Central Avenue.

Grace Haskell, RN, was the hospital’s first superintendent, a post she held for 30 years. It was very rare for a woman to hold such a position at the time. Most doctors and board members were male. The hospital also had a nursing school from 1906 until 1952, when colleges began offering professional nursing programs.

It was Haskell’s persistence in 1925 that convinced the city of Dover to fund new laboratory equipment, improved X-ray equipment and a new patient record system, allowing the hospital to be designated a Class A Hospital by the American Hospital Association.

In 1954, the hospital changed its name to Wentworth City of Dover Hospital.

In the 1950s, a donation from the estate of Louise B. Douglass was used to replace the hospital’s male and female pavilions, as well as Haskell’s home, which was the original administrative building. Mrs. Douglass was the wife of Francis S. Douglass, a respected Dover citizen and former executive at the American Woolen Company’s Dover plant. Under the terms of Mrs. Douglass’s will, a trust of approximately half a million dollars was designated for a new hospital. The balance of the funds for the $800,000 construction project came from the Hill-Burton federal loan program.

In 1961 the hospital changed its name to what it is today, Wentworth-Douglass Hospital, in honor of the Douglass’s donations. The Douglass Memorial wing opened on July 30, 1961, bringing the total capacity to “90 beds and 24 bassinets.”

In the 1960s, there were two more additions - the Dunaway Pavilion and the Anna E. Dunaway wing, funded by the S. Judson Dunaway Foundation, the same foundation that contributed to Dover’s indoor pool at Henry Law Park. S. Judson Dunaway was an Ogunquit philanthropist and Dover industrialist.

In 1982, Wentworth-Douglass Hospital became the first Seacoast hospital to be designated as a trauma center and that same year the hospital separated from the city and incorporated as a non-profit community hospital.

The hospital’s largest addition, the four-story Garrison Wing – named in honor of Dover “the Garrison City” - opened in January 2013.

Wentworth-Douglass Hospital was awarded Magnet® designation in 2016 and joined the Mass General Brigham family in 2017. Our not-for-profit charitable health care organization now consists of more than 3,500 employees, including 850+ registered nurses and a medical staff of over 500 physicians and advanced practitioners, dedicated to the health, safety and well-being of residents and visitors of the Seacoast area of New Hampshire and southern Maine. Wentworth-Douglass Hospital is a 178-bed hospital, with several urgent cares and walk-in facilities, multiple testing centers, Wentworth Health Partners (primary and specialty provider practices), The Works Family Health and Fitness Center, and the Wentworth-Douglass Foundation.

Mass General Brigham (formerly Partners HealthCare) was founded in 1994 by Brigham and Women’s and Massachusetts General hospitals. An integrated health care system, Mass General Brigham includes primary care and specialty physicians, community hospitals, the two-founding academic medical centers, specialty facilities, community health centers and other health-related entities.

(Historical data from “A Place of Healing: A History of Wentworth-Douglass Hospital,” by Noreen A. Biehl).

== Foundation ==
The Wentworth-Douglass is also supported by a charitable foundation.

The Wentworth-Douglass Foundation’s largest annual fundraiser is the Seacoast Cancer 5K, one of New Hampshire’s biggest road races.
