= Larry Dossey =

American internist and author (1940–2026)

- Born: September 27, 1940; Groesbeck, Texas, U.S.
- Died: August 25, 2026 (aged 85); Santa Fe, New Mexico, U.S.
- Occupations: Alternative-medicine advocate, public speaker, writer, physician
- Website: larrydosseymd.com

Larry Dossey (September 27, 1940 – August 25, 2026) was an American internist and author based in Texas who advocated for a blending of orthodox medicine and spiritual medicine from the 1980s. Along with a small handful of other physicians (such as Bernie Siegel), he was early in orienting his patient advocacy along lines of New Age principles, preceding the better known Deepak Chopra in that field.

Dossey's "nonlocality" approach involves sending "healing energy" (though prayer, meditation, visualization, etc) to distant patients. By his account, modern medicine can be divided into three "eras": his Era I is conventional medicine of the 19th and early 20th centuries, which he terms "Mechanical Medicine"; his Era II is later 20th-century "Mind-Body Medicine"; and his Era III is 21st century "consciousness as energy" medicine that he said links people throughout the globe.

== Background ==
Dossey was born in Groesbeck, Texas on September 27, 1940. According to his written biography on his personal website, Dossey graduated from University of Texas at Austin and received an M.D. from University of Texas Southwestern Medical Center in Dallas (1967). Dossey became a United States Army Medical Corps officer and served as a battalion surgeon in Vietnam during the Vietnam War, being decorated for valor. He served as Chief of Staff of Medical City Dallas Hospital (1982). Dossey died in Santa Fe, New Mexico on August 25, 2026, at the age of 85.

== Reception ==
Dossey's writings and opinions have been controversial, having drawn both praise and criticism.

Surgical oncologist David Gorski has written that Dossey utilizes straw man arguments, misrepresents and misunderstands medical research and "the evidence base in favor of the woo that Dr. Dossey favors is pathetic in comparison to that supporting science-based medicine." In 2010 Dossey co-wrote a post in The Huffington Post called "The Mythology Of Science-Based Medicine" with Deepak Chopra and Rustum Roy, which Gorski characterized as "an exercise that combines cherry-picking, logical fallacies, and whining, raising the last of these almost to an art form."

Gary P. Posner, a physician, has criticized Dossey for writing "New Age psychobabble". Posner in a review has stated that Dossey uncritically accepts psychic powers, parapsychology experiments and dubious claims such as voodoo or "distant healing" as genuine, whilst ignoring the literature that has refuted these subjects.

Psychologist Robert A. Baker in a review for Dossey's Healing Words wrote that it is an entertaining book but "We'd all be better served—Dossey, his patients, his readers, and the general public—if Dossey would take his head out of the clouds, plant his feet on the ground, and stop talking nonsense. Everyone knows that evil looks won't kill you. We also know that sticks and stones will break your bones and a doctor's words alone-no matter how kind or gentle-will never heal you."

John Roberts in the British Medical Journal has described Healing Words as a religious book, useful to see how an argument could be made on how humans could utilize prayer to heal but some of the book was "convoluted new-age jargon".

Dossey's views and activities have frequently been reported in the media. For example, Business Insider quoted Dossey as having "coined the term 'time-sickness' in 1982 to describe the belief that 'time is getting away, that there isn't enough of it, and that you must pedal faster and faster to keep up.'"

The Belfast Telegraph described Dossey as a "distinguished American physician" and a "New York Times best-selling author", while quoting his views on Lorna Byrne. The Minnesota Star Tribune reported that in 1993, Dossey had appeared on the Oprah Winfrey show, in an episode themed on the power of prayer, describing Dossey as "a physician who advocates for spirituality in health care".

The "Jacket Copy" blog of the Los Angeles Times interviewed Dossey and quoted him extensively when reviewing one of his books.

== Works ==
- Dossey, Larry, (1982) One Mind: How Our Individual Mind is Part of a Greater Consciousness and Why It Matters, 2013, Carlsbad, California, Hay House. ISBN 978-1-4019-4377-6
- Dossey, Larry; Capra, Fritjof (foreword) (1982). Space, Time, & Medicine. Boulder: Shambhala. ISBN 0877732248.
- Dossey, Larry, (1989) Recovering the Soul
- Dossey, Larry (1993). Healing words : the power of prayer and the practice of medicine (1st ed.). San Francisco, California: HarperSanFrancisco. ISBN 0062502514.
- Dossey, Larry (1997). Prayer is good medicine : how to reap the healing benefits of prayer (1st ed.). San Francisco, California: HarperSanFrancisco. ISBN 0062514237.
- Dossey, Larry, (1999) Reinventing Medicine: Beyond Mind-Body to a New Era of Healing; San Francisco, California: HarperSanFrancisco.
- Dossey, Larry (2009). The Power of Premonitions: How Knowing the Future Can Shape Our Lives. Dutton. ISBN 978-0525951162.
