= Beth Israel Deaconess Hospital =

Beth Israel Deaconess Hospital may refer to:

- Beth Israel Deaconess Hospital – Milton in Milton, Massachusetts, U.S.
- Beth Israel Deaconess Hospital – Needham in Needham, Massachusetts, U.S.
- Beth Israel Deaconess Hospital – Plymouth in Plymouth, Massachusetts, U.S.
- Beth Israel Deaconess Medical Center in Boston, Massachusetts, U.S.

== See also ==
- Beth Israel Lahey Health, the Massachusetts-based parent company of the above
- Beth Israel Hospital (disambiguation)
- Deaconess Hospital (disambiguation)
