= Deaconess Hospital =

Deaconess Hospital may refer to:

== Scotland ==
- Deaconess Hospital, Edinburgh

== United States ==
=== Arizona ===
- Arizona Deaconess Hospital, Phoenix

=== Idaho ===
- Bethany Deaconess Hospital, American Falls

=== Indiana ===
- Deaconess Midtown Hospital, Evansville
- Deaconess Gateway and Women's Hospital, Newburgh
- Deaconess Gibson Hospital, Princeton

=== Massachusetts ===
- Beth Israel Deaconess Medical Center, successor to New England Deaconess Hospital, Boston
- Beth Israel Deaconess Hospital – Milton
- Beth Israel Deaconess Hospital – Needham
- Beth Israel Deaconess Hospital – Plymouth

=== Missouri ===
- Deaconess Hospital (St. Louis, Missouri)

=== Montana ===
- Bozeman Deaconess Hospital, predecessor to Bozeman Health in Bozeman
- Montana Deaconess Medical Center, predecessor to Benefis Health System in Great Falls
- Rosebud County Deaconess Hospital, Forsyth

=== New York ===
- Evangelical Deaconess Hospital, Brooklyn
- Norwegian Lutheran Deaconess Hospital, Brooklyn (now NYU Langone Hospital)

=== Oklahoma ===
- Deaconess Hospital (Oklahoma City, Oklahoma)

=== Washington ===
- MultiCare Deaconess Hospital, Spokane

== See also ==
- Deaconess, the Christian ministry associated with Deaconess hospitals
