= Timo Krings =

German radiologist

- Born: Germany
- Education: University Hospital Aachen
- Known for: interventional neuroradiology
- Awards: Anderson Award from the Wightman-Berris Academy
- Scientific career
- Fields: Anatomy, MRI, Neuroradiology, Neurosciences
- Workplaces: University of Toronto; UMass Chan Medical School; Beth Israel Lahey Health; Toronto Western Hospital

Timo Krings is a German neuroradiologist known for his contributions to the fields of diagnostic and interventional neuroradiology.

He is currently the chair of the Division of Neurointerventional Radiology and director of the Neurovascular Center at the Lahey Clinic and Beth Israel Lahey Health in Boston and a full professor of radiology at UMass Chan School of Medicine.

He received the Anderson Award from the Wightman-Berris Academy for his work to the development of the Neuroradiology Program in Toronto. Additionally, he was awarded with the Edward Lansdown Award for his work in University of Toronto.

== Biography ==
He was born and educated in Germany. He studied medicine at RWTH Aachen University and continued his training in Neuroradiology under Armin Thron at University Hospital Aachen.

His educational path included additional training at Harvard Medical School and a fellowship in neurointerventional radiology in France under Pierre Lasjaunias. In 2008, he joined the University of Toronto, where he was Site Chief of Medical Imaging at the Toronto Western Hospital, Division Head of Diagnostic and Interventional Neuroradiology and held the David Braley and Nancy Gordon Chair in Interventional Neuroradiology until 2024 when he joined the Lahey Clinic in Boston, USA.

=== Scientific career ===
His research is focused on imaging and treatment for conditions such as brain aneurysms, arteriovenous malformations, and stroke. He has contributed to methods that help predict and prevent brain bleeding from vascular malformations.

He collaborates with Texas Children's Hospital and researchers like Karen Chen to advance fetal brain surgery for treating vein of Galen malformations. This work involves investigating innovative approaches to improve outcomes in affected infants, with ongoing trials contributing to the rapidly evolving field.

He has researched to the study of genetic factors associated with brain arteriovenous malformations (BAVMs), collaborating with Ivan Radovanovic and Jason Fish at the University Health Network (UHN), he has explored the role of the KRAS gene, which is implicated in both cerebrovascular conditions and certain cancers; this research examines the potential application of existing cancer therapies to modulate the genetic pathways of BAVMs.

By developing and studying preclinical models with altered KRAS expression, Krings and his colleagues aim to identify novel therapeutic strategies for this challenging condition.

He received the awards from European Society of Neuroradiology, the Lucien Appel Prize, and the Founders award in Interventional Neuroradiology.

Krings is involved in the organization of multiple teaching courses including the Interventional Neuroradiology Symposium and the Canadian Neuroradiology Course.

Krings has published over 450 internationally peer reviewed articles that have accumulated over 29,000 citations, with an H Index of 89 and authored several books and book chapters on neurovascular imaging and interventional neuroradiology.

== Selected publications ==
=== Journals ===
- Krings, T.; Geibprasert, S. (2009-04-01). "Spinal Dural Arteriovenous Fistulas". American Journal of Neuroradiology. 30 (4): 639–648. doi:10.3174/ajnr.A1485. ISSN 0195-6108. PMC 7051782. PMID 19213818.
- Geibprasert, S.; Pongpech, S.; Armstrong, D.; Krings, T. (2009). "Dangerous Extracranial–Intracranial Anastomoses and Supply to the Cranial Nerves: Vessels the Neurointerventionalist Needs to Know". American Journal of Neuroradiology. 30 (8): 1459–1468. doi:10.3174/ajnr.A1500. ISSN 0195-6108. PMC 7051597. PMID 19279274.
- Krings, Timo; Mandell, Daniel M.; Kiehl, Tim-Rasmus; Geibprasert, Sasikhan; Tymianski, Michael; Alvarez, Hortensia; terBrugge, Karel G.; Hans, Franz-Josef (2011-09-20). "Intracranial aneurysms: from vessel wall pathology to therapeutic approach". Nature Reviews. Neurology. 7 (10): 547–559. doi:10.1038/nrneurol.2011.136. ISSN 1759-4766. PMID 21931350.
- Lawton, Michael T.; Rutledge, W. Caleb; Kim, Helen; Stapf, Christian; Whitehead, Kevin J.; Li, Dean Y.; Krings, Timo; terBrugge, Karel; Kondziolka, Douglas; Morgan, Michael K.; Moon, Karam; Spetzler, Robert F. (2015-05-28). "Brain arteriovenous malformations". Nature Reviews. Disease Primers. 1 15008. doi:10.1038/nrdp.2015.8. ISSN 2056-676X. PMID 27188382.
- Alsufayan, R.; Hess, C.; Krings, T. (2023-08-17). "Monoclonal Antibodies: What the Diagnostic Neuroradiologist Needs to Know". American Journal of Neuroradiology. 44 (12): 1358–1366. doi:10.3174/ajnr.a7974. ISSN 0195-6108. PMC 10714862. PMID 37591772.

=== Books ===
- Krings, Timo; Geibprasert, Sasikhan; Brugge, Karel G. ter (2011). Case-based interventional neuroradiology. New York Stuttgart: Thieme. ISBN 978-1-60406-373-8.
- Krings, Timo; Geibprasert, Sasikhan; Cruz, Juan Pablo; Brugge, Karel G. ter ter, eds. (2015). Neurovascular anatomy in interventional neuroradiology: a case-based approach. New York: Thieme. ISBN 978-1-60406-839-9.
- Brinjikji, Waleed; Krings, Timo (2020). Imaging in neurovascular disease: a case-based approach. New York, NY: Thieme. ISBN 978-1-68420-053-5. OCLC 1103675093.
- Pereira, Vitor Mendes; Dmytriw, Adam A.; Slater, Lee-Anne; Power, Sarah; Krings, Timo (2021). Endovascular management of ischemic stroke: a case-based approach: 239 illustrations. New York Stuttgart Delhi Rio de Janeiro: Thieme. ISBN 978-1-62623-275-4.
