= Boston MedFlight =

Emergency response organization in Massachusetts

Coordinates: 42.4658°N 71.28°W

New England Life Flight

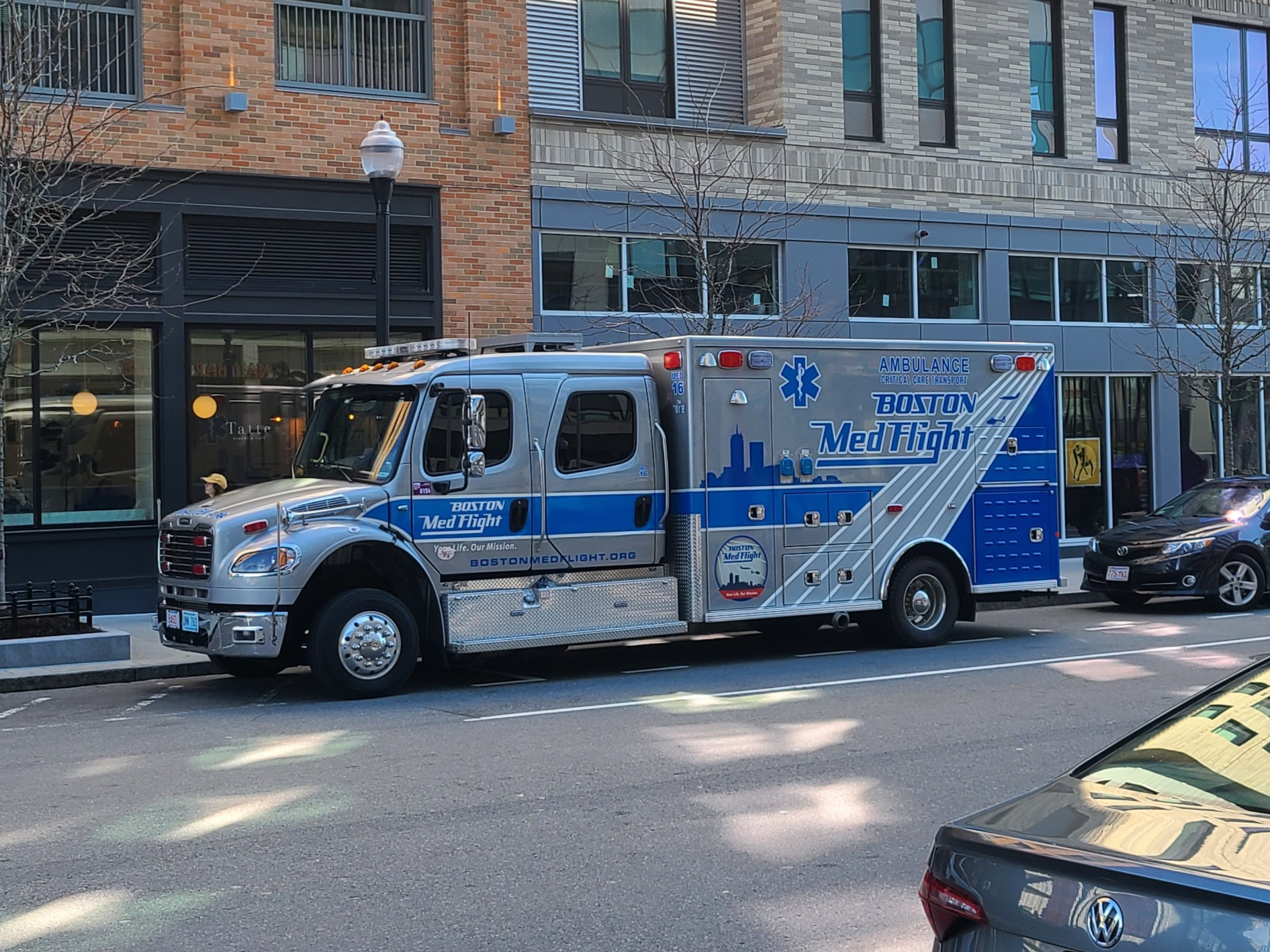
- A Boston MedFlight critical care ambulance
- Trade name: Boston MedFlight
- Type: Air medical services
- Industry: Emergency Medical Services
- Founded: 1985; 41 years ago
- Headquarters: Hanscom Field, Bedford, Massachusetts, US
- Key people: Maura Hughes (CEO)
- Services: Critical care transport; Air ambulance; Ground ambulance
- Website: bostonmedflight.org

New England Life Flight, d/b/a Boston MedFlight (commonly referred to as "BMF"), is a non-profit organization that provides emergency scene response and emergency interfacility transfer in the Greater Boston area at the Critical Care level (higher than the more common Paramedic level) using helicopters, fixed-wing aircraft, and ground ambulances.

BMF is headquartered at Hanscom Field in Bedford, Massachusetts, with additional bases at Plymouth Municipal Airport on the town line between Plymouth and Carver, Massachusetts, Mansfield Municipal Airport in Mansfield, Massachusetts, Lawrence Municipal Airport in North Andover, Massachusetts, and Manchester-Boston Regional Airport in Manchester, New Hampshire.

== Overview ==
The BMF medical team staffing model in all vehicles is one Critical Care Transport Nurse, one Critical Care Transport Specialist (Paramedic).

BMF nurses hold multiple other certifications such as Certified Flight Registered Nurse (CFRN) (within one year of hire if not already certified), Critical Care Registered Nurse (CCRN) and/or Certified Emergency Nurse (CEN). They are also certified EMTs to comply with Massachusetts Department of Public Health ambulance staffing guidelines; both types of aircraft are considered ambulances by the Commonwealth.

BMF Transport Specialists (paramedics) similarly become Certified Flight Paramedics within one year of hire if they do not already hold FP-C certification.

BMF staffs and operates its own communications center at the Bedford headquarters. Communications Specialists are required to be Nationally Registered EMTs, or the Massachusetts equivalent; they are also expected to complete an International Association of Medical Transport Communications Specialists (IAMTCS, formerly National Association of Air-medical Communications Specialists or NAACS) Certified Flight Communicator course within their first year, course schedule permitting.

Their helicopter (rotary wing) and airplane (fixed wing) pilots are rated at the Airline Transport Pilot level, the highest level of pilot license; pilots have no medical duties during transport other than the safe delivery of the patient and medical team. The critical care ground ambulances are operated by Massachusetts-certified emergency medical technicians; in contrast to the pilots, they will assist their medical teammates during transfers.

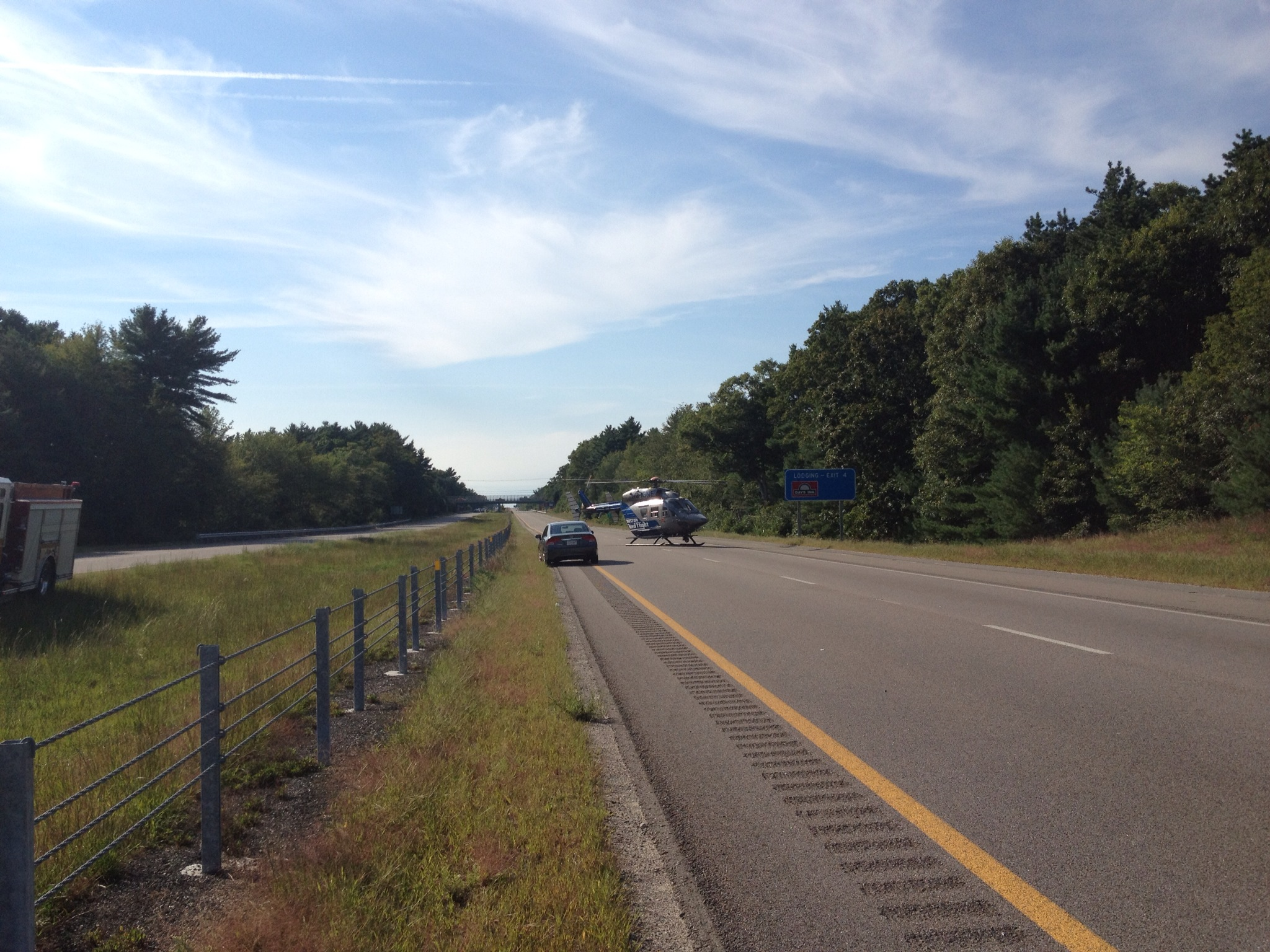
Boston MedFlight helicopter, landed on Interstate 495 in Middleboro, Massachusetts

BMF operates five twin-engine helicopters: four Airbus H145s, and one Eurocopter EC-145 (an earlier version of the H145). BMF also operates eight critical care ground ambulances, and a Beechcraft King Air 200 fixed-wing aircraft.
BMF transports emergency patients regardless of their ability to pay and is financially supported in part by a seven hospital consortium (as of 2017) of the following:

- Beth Israel Deaconess Medical Center
- Boston Children's Hospital
- Boston Medical Center
- Brigham and Women's Hospital
- Massachusetts General Hospital
- Tufts Medical Center
- Lahey Hospital & Medical Center

BMF is a Commission on Accreditation of Medical Transport Systems (CAMTS) accredited critical care transport service in all three transport modes (Rotor wing, fixed wing and ground critical care). BMF was a founding member of the New England Air Alliance, now known as the North East Air Alliance, along with UMass LifeFlight and Hartford HealthCare LifeStar. The goal of NEAA is to enhance the safety of air-medical operations in the region through information sharing.

== History ==
- 1980- American College of Surgeons recommends development of a helicopter transport system for Massachusetts
- 1984- Boston MedFlight is created and a hospital consortium formed to develop helicopter service
- 1985- June 26, Boston MedFlight transports its first patient
- 1992- Second aircraft added to fleet and stationed at Plymouth, Massachusetts airport to expand service to southeastern Massachusetts, the Cape and the Islands
- 1993- 5,000th patient transported
- 1995- North aircraft moved from South Boston to Hanscom Field in Bedford, Massachusetts. Offices now located at Hanscom Air Force Base's building 1727
- 1998- Ground critical care transport service developed in partnership with Armstrong Ambulance
- 1999- Fixed wing service developed in partnership with Eastern Air Charter
- 2002- 20,000th patient transported
- 2003- Independent licensure for ground critical care transport obtained and third helicopter added to fleet
- 2004- Second ground critical care transport vehicle added to Plymouth Base to work in conjunction with the helicopter
- 2006- Night vision goggle (NVG) capability in all helicopters
- 2008- State of the art medical simulation center begins at Bedford Base
- 2009- 40,000th patient transported
- 2010– 25 years of operation celebrated
- 2011- February 23, Boston Medflight Nurses and Paramedics successfully organize with the Massachusetts Nursing Association.
- 2011- BMF opens Lawrence Base
- 2015- Billing staff relocated to Lincoln North, an office building just off-base, due to space constraints
- 2016- Awarded a long-term lease by Massport for the hangar space designated 'Hangar 12A' on the West Ramp of Hanscom Field, also known as 'the civilian side' of the airfield. New hangar is expected to be completed by the spring of 2018
- 2016- March 30, Dr. Suzanne K. Wedel, one of BMF's founders and then-CEO/CMO dies, inspiring BMF to continue her legacy by serving patients with expert care and compassion.
- 2017- January, Awarded its own Part 135 operator's certificate by the FAA. BMF performs its first independent Part 135 transport in March. BMF also opens its fourth base in Mansfield, Massachusetts.
- 2018- October, BMF departs Hanscom Air Force Base and moves into its new corporate headquarters on the civilian side of Hanscom Field, consolidating its Bedford operations under one roof at Hangar 12A
- 2025- March, BMF establishes an additional base at Portsmouth International Airport at Pease in Portsmouth, New Hampshire their first out-of-state operation.
- 2026- March, BMF moves the Pease base to Manchester–Boston Regional Airport in Manchester, New Hampshire
