= DSV =

DSV may refer to:

In sports:

- DSV Leoben, a football team based in Leoben, Austria
- German Swimming Federation (Deutscher Schwimm-Verband)
- German Ski Association (Deutscher Skiverband)

In transportation:

- DSV, a Danish transport company
- Dansville Municipal Airport (IATA code) in Dansville, New York
- deep-submergence vehicles, deep-diving self-propelled crewed submarines (in particular in the names of US Navy submersibles)
- diving support vessel, a ship used in commercial diving
- German State Railway Wagon Association (Deutscher Staatsbahnwagenverband)

In computing:

- delimiter-separated values, a way to store two-dimensional arrays of data, in textual form

In culture:

- seaQuest DSV, an American science fiction television series (later renamed seaQuest 2032)

In other uses:

- Deutsche Schule Valparaiso, a German international school in Viña del Mar/Valparaiso, Chile
- Deutsche Schule Valencia, a German international school in Valencia, Spain
- Life Sciences Division (Division des Sciences du Vivant) of the French Alternative Energies and Atomic Energy Commission
- Sovereigntist Right in French Politics
