= The House of God (film) =

- Directed by: Donald Wrye
- Written by: Donald Wrye
- Based on: The House of God by Samuel Shem
- Produced by: Charles H. Joffe; Harold Schneider
- Starring: Tim Matheson; Charles Haid; Michael Sacks; Ossie Davis; Howard Rollins
- Cinematography: Gerald Hirschfeld
- Edited by: Billy Weber
- Music by: Basil Poledouris
- Distributed by: United Artists
- Release date: July 31, 1981
- Running time: 108 minutes
- Country: United States
- Language: English

The House of God is a 1981 American comedy-drama film written and directed by Donald Wrye and starring Tim Matheson, Charles Haid, Michael Sacks, Ossie Davis, and Howard Rollins. It is based on Samuel Shem's 1978 novel of the same name. According to Leonard Maltin, the film was never released theatrically.

== Cast ==
- Tim Matheson as Roy Basch
- Charles Haid as Fats (The Fatman)
- Bess Armstrong as Cissy Anderson
- Chip Zien as Eddie
- Michael Sacks as Wayne Potts
- Lisa Pelikan as Jo Miller
- George Coe as Dr. Leggo
- Ossie Davis as Dr. Sanders
- Howard Rollins as Chuck Johnston
- James Cromwell as Officer Quick
- Sandra Bernhard as Angel Dutton
- Leo Burmester as Dr. Gath
- Charles Fleischer as Hyper Hooper
- Joe Piscopo as Dr. Fishberg
- Michael Richards as Dr. Pinkus
- Gilbert Gottfried as Paramedic
- Lenny Schultz as Zeiss

== Reception ==
Leonard Maltin awarded the film one and a half stars.
