= Alvaro Pascual-Leone =

Spanish neurologist (born 1961)

- Born: August 7, 1961 (age 64); Valencia, Spain
- Occupation: Professor of Neurology at Harvard Medical School
- Known for: Director of the Berenson-Allen Center for Noninvasive Brain Stimulation

Alvaro Pascual-Leone (born 7 August 1961 in Valencia, Spain) is a Spanish-American Professor of neurology at Harvard Medical School, with which he has been affiliated since 1997. He is currently a Senior Scientist at the Hinda and Arthur Marcus Institute for Aging Research at Hebrew SeniorLife. He was previously the Director of the Berenson-Allen Center for Noninvasive Brain Stimulation and Program Director of the Harvard-Thorndike Clinical Research Center of the Beth Israel Deaconess Medical Center in Boston.

== Career ==
Dr. Pascual-Leone obtained his school education in Deutsche Schule Valencia between 1967 and 1979. After getting his Abitur in 1979, he started medical school in Freiburg, Germany. He obtained an M.D. and a Ph.D. in Neurophysiology in 1984 and 1985 respectively, both from the Faculty of Medicine of Freiburg University in Germany. He also trained at the University of Minnesota and the US National Institutes of Health.

== Family ==
Pascual-Leone lives in Wayland, Massachusetts, with his wife, Elizabeth, and their three children. His father is Alvaro Pascual-Leone Pascual and his mother is Teresa Garcia Ferrer.

== Awards and honours ==
He has authored over 700 scientific papers and has received several international honors and awards, including the Ramon y Cajal Award in Neuroscience (Spain), the Norman Geschwind Prize in Behavioral Neurology from the American Academy of Neurology, the Friedrich Wilhelm Bessel Research Award from The Alexander von Humboldt Foundation (Germany), and the Jean Signoret Prize from the Ipsen Foundation (France). In 2000, he won the Daniel D. Federman Outstanding Clinical Educator Award. He is a member of the Spanish Royal Academy of Pharmacy.
