= Michael Sacks =

American actor

Michael Sacks (born September 11, 1948 in New York City) is an American actor and technology industry executive who played the role of Billy Pilgrim in George Roy Hill's Slaughterhouse Five (1972).

== Biography ==
Sacks has a Bachelor of Arts in Social Relations from Harvard College and a Master of Science in Computer Science from Columbia University.

Sacks played the role of Billy Pilgrim in George Roy Hill's Slaughterhouse Five (1972), an adaptation from the novel by Kurt Vonnegut.

Sacks also appeared in Steven Spielberg's Sugarland Express (1974), as the kidnapped highway patrolman; The Private Files of J. Edgar Hoover (1977), as Melvin Purvis; The Amityville Horror (1979), as Jeff; Hanover Street (1979), with Harrison Ford; the thriller Split Image (1982); and the television disaster film Starflight: The Plane That Couldn't Land (1983). On Broadway, he was the bewildered Vietnam vet "Mark" in Kennedy's Children by Robert Patrick. He retired from the entertainment industry in 1984; his last role was in the black comedy film The House of God, with Tim Matheson.

After spending time working in technology positions on Wall Street, in 2004 Sacks joined the online bond trading company, MarketAxess, as head of global applications development. He was employed by Morgan Stanley from 1994 to 2004, as executive director, global head of bond technology for the fixed income division. Other assignments at Morgan Stanley included chief operating officer for fixed income technology and global head of technology for the foreign exchange division. Prior to Morgan Stanley he held positions at Salomon Brothers, Inc. and IBM Research Division.

== Filmography ==
Year	Title	Role	Notes
1972	Slaughterhouse Five	Billy Pilgrim	
1973	Carola	Henri Marceau	TV movie
1974	Sugarland Express	Officer Maxwell Slide	
1977	The Private Files of J. Edgar Hoover	Melvin Purvis	
1979	Hanover Street	2nd Lieut. Martin Hyer	
1979	The Amityville Horror	Jeff	
1982	Split Image	Gabriel	
1983	Starflight: The Plane That Couldn't Land	Pete	TV movie
1984	The House of God	Wayne Potts	(final film role)
