= Beth Israel Deaconess Hospital – Needham =

Community hospital in Needham, Massachusetts

- Beth Israel Lahey Health

Geography
- Location: 148 Chestnut Street, Needham, Massachusetts, United States
- Coordinates: 42.27701°N 71.23668°W

Organization
- Type: Community

Services
- Emergency department: Yes
- Beds: 73

History
- Former names: Glover Home and Hospital, Deaconess–Glover Hospital
- Opened: September 16, 1912; 113 years ago

Links
- Website: bidneedham.org
- Lists: Hospitals in Massachusetts

Beth Israel Deaconess Hospital – Needham (commonly shortened as BID Needham) is a small non-profit community hospital located in Needham, Massachusetts. A member of Beth Israel Lahey Health, in 2024 the hospital had 73 beds, discharged 5,290 inpatients, and operated with total revenues of $158.6 million at a deficit of $1.6 million.

== History ==
The facility originally known as Glover Home and Hospital opened on September 16, 1912. It was named after Frederick Pope Glover, who upon his death in 1901 left his estate to the town in order that it fund a hospital. Glover's gift was not accepted by the town until 1910, as there was sentiment that the hospitals of Boston were close enough to meet local needs.

The facility became an affiliate of New England Deaconess Hospital in 1994. In 1996, that entity and Beth Israel Hospital merged to form Beth Israel Deaconess Medical Center, which itself merged in 2019 with Lahey Hospital & Medical Center to form Beth Israel Lahey Health.
