= The House of God =

1978 novel by Samuel Shem

- First edition
- Author: Samuel Shem
- Language: English
- Genre: Satirical novel
- Publisher: Richard Marek Publishers
- Publication date: August 1978
- Publication place: United States
- Media type: Print (Hardback & Paperback)
- Pages: 429
- ISBN: 0-440-13368-8
- OCLC: 7423035
- Preceded by: None
- Followed by: Mount Misery

The House of God is a 1978 satirical novel by Samuel Shem (a pseudonym used by psychiatrist Stephen Bergman). The novel follows a group of medical interns at a fictionalized version of Beth Israel Hospital over the course of a year in the early 1970s, focusing on the psychological harm and dehumanization caused by their residency training. The book, described by the New York Times as "raunchy, troubling and hilarious", was viewed as scandalous at the time of its publication, but has since acquired a cult following and is frequently included in the discussion of humanism, ethics, and training in medicine.

== Storyline ==
Dr. Roy Basch is an intelligent but naive former Rhodes Scholar and BMS ("Best Medical School")-educated intern ('tern') working in a hospital called the House of God after having completed his medical studies at BMS. Basch is poorly prepared for the grueling hours and the sudden responsibilities with limited guidance from senior attending physicians. He begins the year on a rotation supervised by an enigmatic and iconoclastic senior resident who goes by the name "The Fat Man". The Fat Man teaches him that the only way to keep patients in good health and to survive psychologically is to break the rules. The Fat Man provides his interns with wisdom such as his own "Laws of the House of God". One of his teachings is that in the House of God, most of the diagnostic procedures, treatments, and medications received by the patients known as "gomers" (see Glossary, below) actually harm these patients instead of helping them. Basch becomes convinced of the accuracy of the Fat Man's advice and begins to follow it. Because he follows the Fat Man's advice and does nothing to the "gomers", they remain in good health. Therefore, his team is recognized as one of the best in the hospital and he is recognized as an excellent intern by everyone even though he is breaking the rules.

Later, the Fat Man must leave for a rotation with another team. Roy is then supervised by a more conventional resident named Jo who—unlike the Fat Man—follows the rules, but unknowingly hurts the "gomers" by doing so. Basch survives the rotation with Jo by claiming to perform numerous tests and treatments on the "gomers" while doing nothing to treat them. These patients again do well, and Basch's reputation as an excellent intern is maintained.

During the course of the novel, working in the hospital takes a psychological toll on Basch. His personality and outlook change, and he has outbursts of temper. He has adulterous trysts with various nurses and social service workers (nicknamed the "Sociable Cervix"), and his relationship with his girlfriend Berry suffers. A colleague, Wayne Potts, commits suicide. Potts had been constantly badgered by the upper hierarchy and haunted by a patient—nicknamed "The Yellow Man" (due to the jaundice from his fulminant necrotic hepatitis)--who goes comatose and eventually (after months) dies possibly because Potts had not put him on steroids. Basch secretly euthanizes a patient called Saul the leukemic tailor, whose illness had gone into remission but was back in the hospital in incredible pain and begging for death. Basch becomes more and more emotionally unstable until his friends force him to attend a mime performance by Marcel Marceau, where he has an experience of catharsis and helps him recover his emotional stability.

By the end of the book, it turns out that the psychiatry resident, Cohen, has inspired most of the year's group of interns—as well as two well-spoken policemen, Gilheeney and Quick—to pursue a career in psychiatry. The terrible year convinces most of the interns to receive psychiatric help themselves. The book ends with Basch and Berry vacationing in France before he begins his psychiatry residency, which is how the book begins as well; the entire book is a flashback. But even while vacationing, bad memories of the House of God haunt Basch. Basch is convinced that he could not have gotten through the year without Berry, and he asks her to marry him.

== Characters ==
Staff

Interns and residents

- Dr. Roy Basch, the protagonist and one of the first-year residents.
- Dr. Fishberg ("The Fish"), the Chief Resident; wishes to obtain a GI fellowship.
- Jo, a high-achieving resident who wishes to obtain a cardiology fellowship.
- "Fats" ("The Fatman"), an unconventional but effective second-year resident; wishes to obtain a GI fellowship.
- Dr. Chuck Johnston, a black first-year resident from Chicago; Basch's best friend.
- Dr. Jeff Cohen, the psychiatry resident.
- "Eat My Dust" Eddie, a first-year resident fixated on winning the Black Crow Award (awarded for most consents for postmortems/postmortems); wishes to pursue oncology.
- Elihu, "a tall beak-nosed Sephardic Jew with a frizzy Isro-Afro, rumored to be the worst surgical intern in the history of the House".
- Harry, another first-year resident fixated on winning the Black Crow Award.
- "Hyper Hooper", a first-year resident who wins the Black Crow Award.
- Dr. Howard Runtsky (Runt), a first-year resident (intern) who takes Valium for his nerves. Runtsky is a friend of Basch's, having been a classmate of his at BMS. He is described as a "short, stocky product of two red-hot psychoanalysts". Runtsky has sex with one of the nurses and breaks out of his shell; he "[goes] west for a "classic Eastern" psychiatric training program on the "mountain campus" of the University of Wyoming.
- Dr. Wayne Potts, a first-year resident (intern) from Charleston, South Carolina who is insecure and uncertain. Married to an MBH surgical intern, Potts is described as "a nice guy but depressed, repressed, and kind of compressed, dressed in crisp white, pockets bulging with instruments".

Other doctors

- Dr. Leggo, the Chief of Medicine who believes in doing everything to save patients.
- Dr. Gath, a surgeon.
- Dr. Otto Kreinberg, one of the attending physicians.
- Dr. Pinkus, a "tall, emaciated-looking staff cardiologist, heading toward forty".
- Dr. Putzel, a private doctor who has admitting rights.
- "Grenade Room" Dubler, a former intern/resident.

Other staff

- Sergeant Finton Gilheeny, a "huge, barrel-shaped" police officer with "red hair growing out of and into most of the slitty features on his fat red face".
- Officer Quick, a police officer who looks like a "matchstick, decked out, facially, in white of skin and black of hair, with vigilant eyes and a large and worrisome mouth filled with many disparate teeth".
- Angel, one of the Medical ICU (MICU) nurses, "buxom, Irish, with wraparound muscular thighs and a creamy complexion".
- Hazel, the head housekeeper who engages in a sexual relationship with Chuck Johnston.
- Molly, a nurse who engages in a sexual relationship with Roy Basch. Molly described lovemaking as "the feeling of having a centipede walk through wearing gold cleats".
- Rosalie Cohen, a junior social worker who engages in a sexual relationship with Howard Runtsky.
- Selma, the head social worker who engages in a sexual relationship with Basch.
- Lionel, one of the HELP, a "guy in the Blue Blazer" who "help[s] with anything".

Patients

- Dr. Sanders, the first Black doctor who interned with Dr. Leggo; dies from leukemia.
- Anna O., a 'gomere' who cries, "ROODLE ROODLE".
- George Donowitz, a private patient.
- Ina Goober, a former New Masada resident who cries, "Go avay".
- Mr. Itzak Rokitansky, a former college professor who had suffered a stroke; visited daily by his sisters, he cries "PURRTY GUD".
- Rose Katz, a LOL in NAD.

Other

- Berry, Roy's girlfriend.
- Levy, a BMS student.

== Laws of the House of God ==
The Fat Man's laws

1. GOMERS don't die.
2. GOMERS go to ground.
3. At a cardiac arrest, the first procedure is to take your own pulse.
4. The patient is the one with the disease.
5. Placement comes first.
6. There is no body cavity that cannot be reached with a #14G needle and a good strong arm.
7. Age + BUN = Lasix dose.
8. They can always hurt you more.

Roy Basch's further laws

9. The only good admission is a dead admission.
10. If you don't take a temperature, you can't find a fever.
11. Show me a BMS (Best Medical Student, a student at The Best Medical School) who only triples my work and I will kiss his feet.
12. If the radiology resident and the medical student both see a lesion on the chest x-ray, there can be no lesion there.
13. The delivery of good medical care is to do as much nothing as possible.

== Context and impact ==
The book takes place during the Watergate scandal, and follows such events as the resignation of Spiro T. Agnew and Richard Nixon.

A 2019 short essay by Shem and an accompanying online documentary document the origins of the book and the characters upon which it is based. The story is semiautobiographical, as the BMS is a thinly veiled Harvard Medical School (commonly called HMS), and The House of God represents the Beth Israel Hospital, now a part of Beth Israel Deaconess Medical Center, one of the HMS-affiliated hospitals in Boston, Massachusetts; "Man's Best Hospital" (MBH) represents Massachusetts General Hospital (MGH).

According to the author, many older physicians were offended by the work. Many of the terms defined in the book (see glossary) have since become widely known and used in medical culture.

The journal Academic Medicine argued The House of God was revolutionary in that it brought to light paradoxical issues of care in modern medicine. Patients (in the book under Putzel) who were not acutely ill could nevertheless be admitted to the hospital and undergo multiple invasive procedures, creating a revenue stream for the hospital but exposing the patient to risk and discomfort, and demoralizing the residents. Reimbursement rules have been changed to prohibit this practice under value-based purchasing (see Pay for performance (healthcare)). JAMA (the Journal of the American Medical Association) has a distinct collection of hundreds of articles titled "Less Is More" that discuss multiple areas of medicine where standard interventions seem to hurt patients. Furthermore, a 2011 essay proposes that the book was an impetus for limiting medical resident work hours.

== Glossary ==
=== Nouns ===
- Gomer: An acronym meaning "get out of my emergency room". The acronym is used to refer to a patient who is frequently admitted to the hospital with complicated but uninspiring and incurable conditions.
- LOL in NAD: "Little old lady in no apparent distress". An elderly patient who, following a minor fall or illness, would be better served by staying at home with good social support rather than being admitted into a hospital. (Compare "NAD" = "no abnormality detected" or "no apparent distress" (used to record the absence of abnormal signs on examination.)
- Zebra: A very unlikely diagnosis in which a more common disease is a more likely cause of a patient's symptoms. The term is derived from the common admonition that "if you hear hoof beats, think horses, not zebras".

=== Verbs ===
- Buff the charts: To make a patient look well-treated in the charts or medical records without actually providing any treatment.
- Turf: To find any excuse to refer a patient to a different department or team.
- Bounce: To return a "turfed" patient to the department that referred him or her.

== Cultural references ==
=== References to life ===
In-jokes abound in the work. One of the principal characters is "Eat My Dust" Eddie, a doctor so-called because of the saying embroidered on his jacket. His name often is abbreviated as EMD, which is also the acronym of the feared, often terminal, cardiac event "electromechanical dissociation" (EMD), otherwise known as pulseless electrical activity (PEA).

=== References by other works ===
In 1981, The House of God was made into a film. The film was never released in theaters or on VHS/DVD, but was shown on HBO multiple times. It starred Charles Haid as The Fat Man, Tim Matheson as Roy, and featured Bess Armstrong, Ossie Davis, Sandra Bernhard, and Michael Richards in supporting roles.

The TV medical sitcom-drama Scrubs features numerous references to The House of God, which was reading material for some of the show's writers. "Turfing", "Bouncing" and "Gomers" occasionally feature in the show's dialogue. In the episode "My Balancing Act", Dr. Cox uses the term "zebra". In the episode "My Student", J.D. quotes the medical student rule: "A famous doctor once said, 'Show me a med student that only triples my work, and I'll kiss his feet.'" One episode focuses on Dr. Dorian saving a patient by "doing nothing," which is a major theme of the novel.

== Sequel ==
Shem has published three sequels to The House of God: Mount Misery, Man's 4th Best Hospital, and Our Hospital.

== Bibliography ==
- Shem, Samuel (August 30, 1978). The House of God (1st ed.). Richard Marek Publishers. ISBN 978-0399900235.
- Shem, Samuel (February 18, 1997). Mount Misery (1st ed.). Fawcett. ISBN 978-0449911181.
- Shem, Samuel. Man's 4th Best Hospital. Berkley. ISBN 978-1984805362. S2CID 204703145.
- Shem, Samuel. Our Hospital.
- "Man's 4th Best Hospital". JAMA. 322 (18): 1746–1750. November 12, 2019. doi:10.1001/jama.2019.16384. PMID 31613307.
