= Bill W. and Dr. Bob =

2013 play by Stephen Bergman and Janet Surrey

Artwork for Bill W. and Dr. Bob.

Bill W. and Dr. Bob is a play written by Stephen Bergman and Janet Surrey, published by Samuel French, Inc. Bill W. and Dr. Bob began previews at The Soho Playhouse on July 8, 2013.

The first production of Bill W. and Dr. Bob began previews off-Broadway at New World Stages on February 16, 2007, and opened on March 5, 2007. It ran for 132 performances and closed on June 10, 2007. It is based on the story of William Wilson (Bill W.) and Dr. Robert Smith (Bob S., or "Dr. Bob"), the founders of Alcoholics Anonymous and their wives Lois Wilson and Anne Smith, creators of Al-Anon. Bill W. and Dr. Bob is written by Stephen Bergman and Janet Surrey, produced by Bradford S. Lovette, Dr. Michael and Judith Weinberg, and The New Repertory Theatre and stars Marc Carver as Man, Kathleen Doyle as Anne Smith, Deanna Dunmyer as Woman, Rachel Harker as Lois Wilson, Patrick Husted as Dr. Bob Smith and Robert Krakovski as Bill Wilson. It was directed by Rick Lombardo and with music composed by Ray Kennedy.

A video was produced of the 2007 Off-Broadway production by The Hazelden Foundation.
