= Berenson-Allen Center for Noninvasive Brain Stimulation =

Research institute in Boston, United States

Coordinates: 42°20′23.6″N 71°6′18.882″W

Berenson-Allen Center for Non-Invasive Brain Stimulation (abbreviated as CNBS or BACNBS) is a brain research institute at Beth Israel Deaconess Medical Center (BIDMC) of Harvard Medical School in the Longwood Medical and Academic Area of Boston, Massachusetts. The center is specialized in research, educating, and clinical care using non-invasive brain stimulation techniques such as transcranial magnetic stimulation (TMS), transcranial direct current stimulation (tDCS). Non-invasive brain stimulation is applied as a diagnostic and therapeutic tool on patients with various neuropsychiatric disorders like depression, schizophrenia, epilepsy, dystonia, Parkinson's disease, chronic pain, and the neurorehabilitation of motor function, cognition, and language after stroke or traumatic brain injury.

In 2012, Berenson Allen Center was directed by Prof. Alvaro Pascual-Leone.
