= New England Baptist Hospital =

- Beth Israel Lahey Health

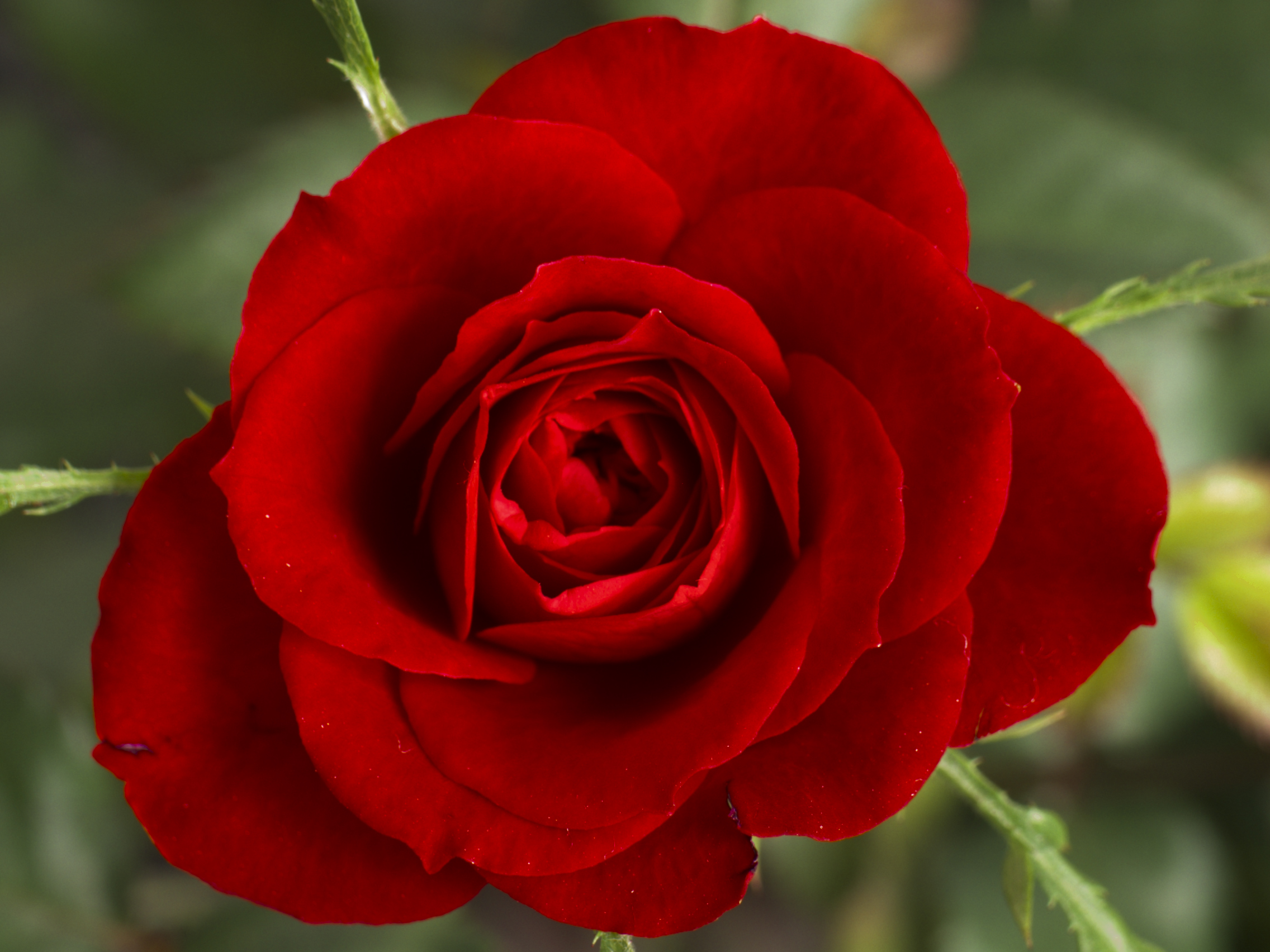
- The Carl J. B. and Olive Currie Rose Fund assures that all patients receive a red rose upon admittance.

Geography
- Location: Boston, Massachusetts, United States
- Coordinates: 42.32938°N 71.10660°W

Organization
- Type: Orthopedic

Services
- Beds: 141

History
- Founded: 1893

Links
- Website: www.nebh.org
- Lists: Hospitals in Massachusetts

New England Baptist Hospital (NEBH) is a 141-bed adult medical-surgical hospital in Boston, Massachusetts specializing in orthopedic care and complex orthopedic procedures. NEBH is an international leader in the treatment of all forms of musculoskeletal disorders and diseases.

NEBH is located atop Parker Hill in the Mission Hill neighborhood within walking distance of the Longwood Medical and Academic Area.

The hospital is a teaching affiliate of both the University of Massachusetts Medical School and Tufts University School of Medicine. It also conducts teaching programs in collaboration with the Harvard T.H. Chan School of Public Health and Harvard Medical School.

Beth Israel Lahey Health is the parent non-profit holding company for New England Baptist, Beth Israel Deaconess Medical Center, the Lahey Hospital & Medical Center, Mount Auburn Hospital and others.

== History ==
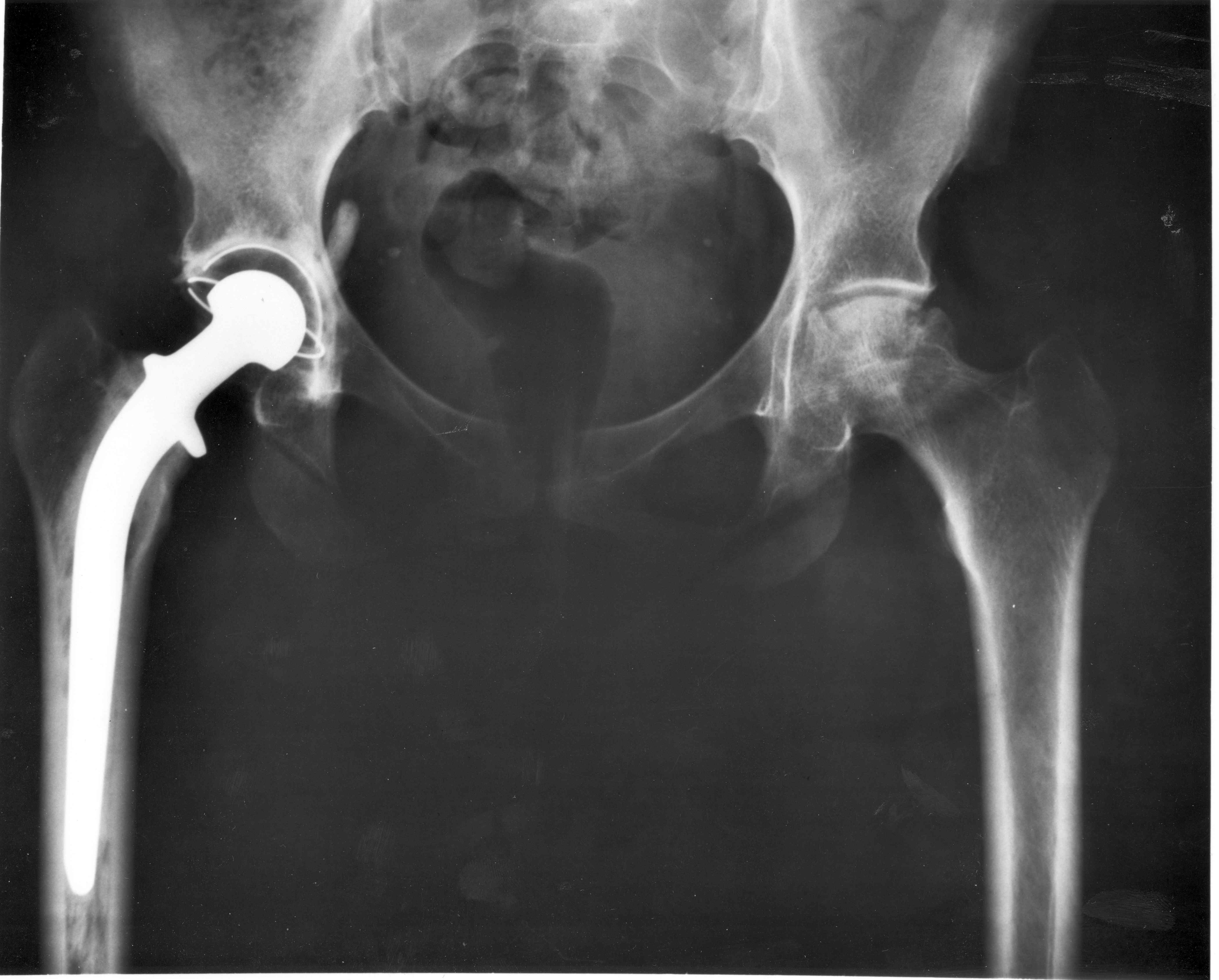
"The Baptist" was the site of one of the first artificial hip replacements in the United States.

New England Baptist Hospital was established in 1893 by the Triennial Convention, now American Baptist Churches USA, the mainline Baptist denomination in USA with a long history in New England.

When the hospital was created in 1893, Parker Hill was a streetcar suburb considered far enough away from downtown Boston to provide fresh air and an escape from the noise and congestion of the city for patients who might benefit from long term rest and relaxation. Parker Hill offers panoramic views of the city, Boston Harbor, and the Blue Hills. In April 2017, New England Baptist Hospital agreed to join with Lahey Health and Beth Israel Deaconess Medical Center.

== Bone & Joint Institute ==
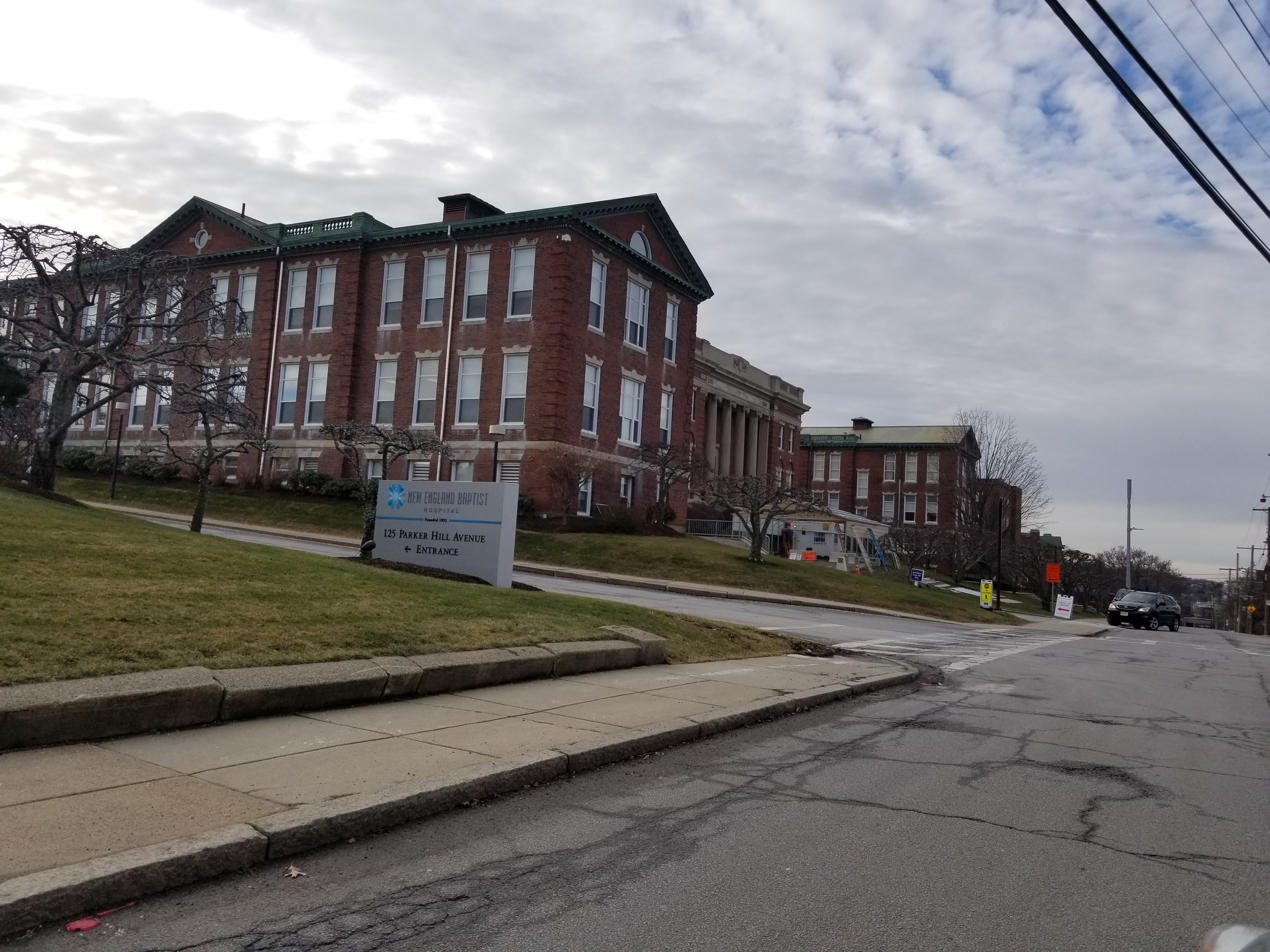
New England Baptist Hospital

Through the associated New England Baptist Bone & Joint Institute, the hospital offers a full range of services in orthopedics and rheumatology, occupational medicine and sports medicine, foot and ankle care, joint replacement, spine care, and hand surgery. The institute offers such services as preventive, educational, diagnostic, treatment, and rehabilitation services.

== Sports medicine ==
NEBH has a long association with sports medicine and has provided services to U.S. Olympic teams and multiple professional athletes.

Boston Red Sox legend Ted Williams came to the Baptist for treatment of a cervical disk disorder in the 1950s. In 1999, esteemed PGA Tour player Jack Nicklaus came to the Baptist for a new hip.

NEBH is the official hospital of the eighteen-time world champion Boston Celtics and has a long association with the Boston Athletic Association which hosts the Boston Marathon.

== Notable mentions ==
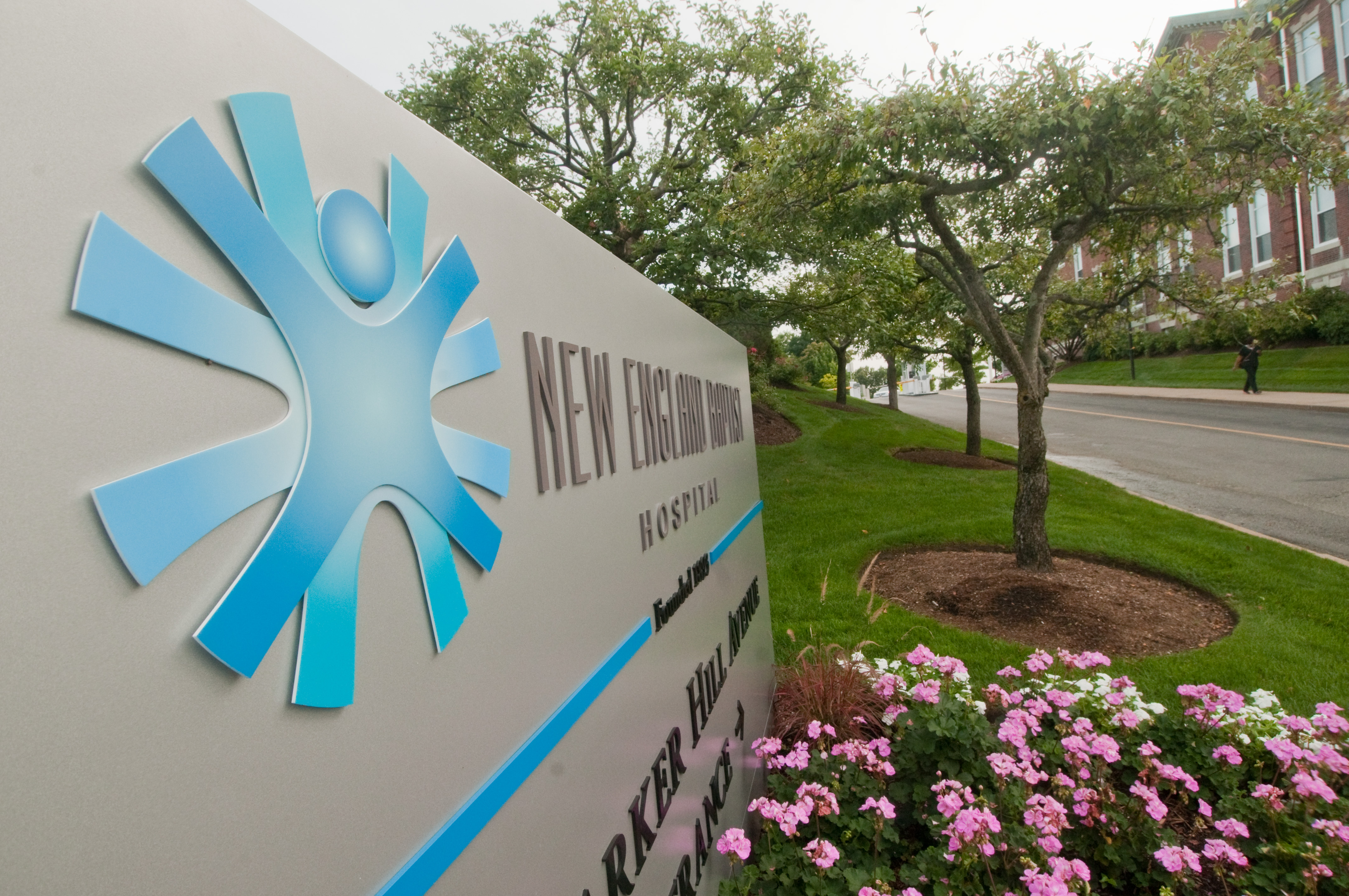
New England Baptist campus on Parker Hill

- The American Association of Retired Persons (AARP) named NEBH as one of the top 10 United States hospitals for knee and hip orthopedics.
- U.S. News & World Report selected the Baptist as one of the top 20 orthopedic hospitals in the country.
- Becker's Hospital Review listed NEBH under 60 Hospitals With Great Orthopedic Programs.
