= The Private Files of J. Edgar Hoover =

1977 film by Larry Cohen

- Directed by: Larry Cohen
- Written by: Larry Cohen
- Produced by: Larry Cohen
- Starring: Broderick Crawford; James Wainwright; Jose Ferrer; Celeste Holm; Ronee Blakely; John Marley; Michael Sacks
- Cinematography: Paul Glickman
- Edited by: Michael Corey
- Music by: Miklós Rózsa
- Production company: Larco Productions
- Distributed by: American International Pictures
- Release date: December 1977
- Running time: 112 minutes
- Country: United States
- Language: English

The Private Files of J. Edgar Hoover is a 1977 American biographical drama film written, produced, and directed by Larry Cohen. It stars Broderick Crawford as Hoover, alongside an ensemble cast including Jose Ferrer, Michael Parks, Rip Torn, James Wainwright, Celeste Holm, Ronee Blakely, John Marley, Michael Sacks, Brad Dexter, Tanya Roberts and in their final screen appearances, Jack Cassidy and Dan Dailey. Both Cassidy and Dailey met with then First Lady Betty Ford and helped director Cohen get permission to film in Washington, D.C., in locales where the real Hoover visited or worked.

The film was shown at the Kennedy Center in Washington to a mixed response from Republicans and Democrats who did not like the dark visions Cohen evoked on American politics and the portrayals of Presidents Franklin D. Roosevelt and Richard M. Nixon: actor Howard da Silva played Roosevelt, and impersonator James LaRoe (credited as Richard M. Dixon) plays Nixon. In an interview in 2019, Cohen said "it enraged all the senators and congressmen that showed up, which I guess was the thing I wanted to do in the first place: make trouble". After it was shown in Washington, the film took a limited nationwide release to theaters, and got a full release to video and television into the 1980s and 1990s.

== Plot ==
The film is a fictionalized chronicle of forty years in the life of FBI director J. Edgar Hoover, from his earliest days in the FBI in the 1920s until his death in 1972. The film is also framed by an opening and closing vignette showing the aftermath of Hoover's death and the mad dash to obtain possession of the "private files" in the title, files that Hoover used to blackmail and extort people in positions of power and authority, to retain leadership of the FBI. The film ultimately shows the Nixon administration attempting and failing to obtain the files and implies that Hoover's blackmail material relating to Nixon was ultimately used by his political enemies to bring down his presidency.

== Cast ==
- Broderick Crawford as FBI Director J. Edgar Hoover
  - James Wainwright as Young J. Edgar Hoover
- Michael Parks as Attorney General Robert F. Kennedy
- José Ferrer as Lionel McCoy
- Celeste Holm as Florence Hollister
- Rip Torn as Dwight Webb
- Dan Dailey as FBI Associate Director Clyde Tolson
- Ronee Blakley as Carrie DeWitt
- John Marley as Dave Hindley
- Howard da Silva as President Franklin D. Roosevelt
- Michael Sacks as FBI Agent Melvin Purvis
- Raymond St. Jacques as Martin Luther King Jr.
- June Havoc as Hoover's Mother
- Lloyd Nolan as Chief Justice Harlan F. Stone
- Andrew Duggan as President Lyndon B. Johnson
- Jack Cassidy as Damon Runyon
- George Plimpton as Quentin Reynolds
- Lloyd Gough as Walter Winchell
- William Jordan as President John F. Kennedy
- Brad Dexter as Alvin Karpis
- Ron Faber as Hijacker
- Bruce Weitz as Voice on Tape

== Production ==
The film was made without the approval of the FBI. Filming locations included New York, Los Angeles and Washington D.C. An auction was planned for January 1977 to secure a distributor.

== Portrayal of Hoover ==
Unlike prior media portrayals, The Private Files of J. Edgar Hoover delves deep into the FBI director's dark sides and many of the controversial acts committed by Hoover. However, it does attempt to provide some passing justification for Hoover's amoral actions: in particular, it explicitly states that Hoover's usage of illegal spying on political enemies was ordered by Franklin D Roosevelt prior to World War II to root out possible Nazi subversives. It also stated that Hoover held an explicitly neutral view on using his spying apparatus to protect America and that he had a falling out with Richard Nixon, when Nixon attempted to create a parallel network of illegal surveillance that answered directly to the White House. Less sympathetic is the film's portrayal of Hoover's adversarial relationship with Martin Luther King Jr., his habit of forcing subordinates to ghostwrite his various books on law enforcement subjects, and his tyrannical treatment of subordinate agents in the Bureau during his forty years in charge of the FBI.

The film also addressed longstanding rumors regarding Hoover's 'abnormal' sexual life; it acknowledges Screw Magazine's public accusation of Hoover being gay and in a relationship with deputy director/longtime colleague Clyde Tolson. However, it presents the accusation as a malicious slur conceived by critic Al Goldstein in retaliation towards Hoover over his persecution of Martin Luther King Jr., after King was assassinated. Both Hoover and Tolson are shocked at the accusation but are shown to refuse to acknowledge it publicly or change their habits of hanging out together socially. Cohen said he did not believe the rumors about Hoover being gay:

"As far as I could ascertain there was never a physical relationship between Hoover and Colson [sic]. They were two old bachelors who liked to go to the ball game and the race track and that was it. There was no romance. All that stuff about Hoover putting on women’s clothing was a total lie. Every responsible historian has for the last fifteen years written that that was nonsense. Never happened. It was subject for late night comedians to tell jokes about and they perpetuated this falsehood."

But while the film takes a definitive stance against the rumor of Hoover's alleged homosexuality, it does explore other elements long rumored about Hoover. In particular, it explicitly states that Hoover's overbearing and dominant mother rendered him unable to fully relate to women to the degree that he would be willing to date or even marry. It further fictionalizes an encounter between Hoover and longtime female friend/admirer Lela Rogers, which indicates that Hoover has a "voyeurism" fetish. In the encounter, Hoover rejects Lela's romantic advances and in return, Lela accuses Hoover of "getting off" on listening to surveillance tapes of others and renting said tapes out to others. Hoover then leaves for his office and in a fit of anger, becomes sexually aroused/frustrated listening to an audio tape of one of his targets making love to a woman.

Finally, the film offers a hypothesis that Watergate and the fall of Richard Nixon was the direct result of the mysterious individual known as Deep Throat (whose identity was still a mystery at the time) having rescued Hoover's files on Nixon and his illegal activities, which were then leaked to Bob Woodward and Carl Bernstein in their investigation of the President. In an interview from 2019 writer-director Larry Cohen said he knew back then that Mark Felt was Deep Throat, and that this knowledge informed his film: "Nobody wanted to believe it. Least of all The Washington Post, because if it was known that Woodward and Bernstein had gotten their information from the FBI they wouldn’t have gotten any Pulitzer Prizes."

== Screenings ==
The film was screened at the Paris French Cinémathèque in January 2023 as part of the Cohen retrospective.

It was also screened on October 27, 2011, by Berkeley Art Museum and Pacific Film Archive as part of their New Hollywood retrospective. It was shown digitally as the destroyed 35mm print found was discovered to have a severe case of vinegar syndrome.
