= Mount Auburn Hospital =

Hospital in Cambridge, Massachusetts

- Beth Israel Lahey Health

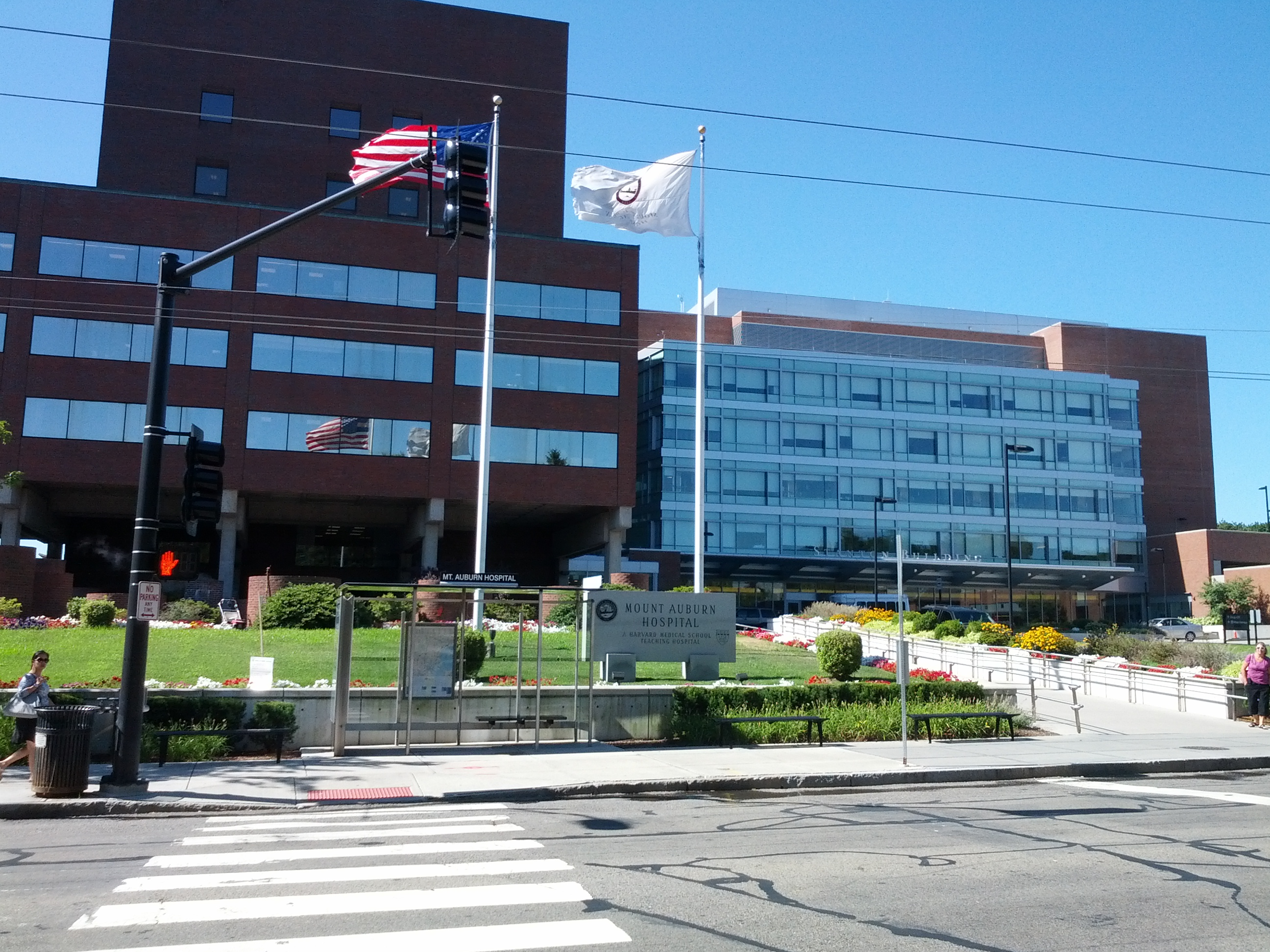
- Main hospital at 330 Mount Auburn Street

Geography
- Location: 330 Mt Auburn St, Cambridge, Massachusetts, United States
- Coordinates: 42.374414°N 71.133776°W

Organization
- Type: Teaching
- Affiliated university: Harvard Medical School
- Patron: Emily Elizabeth Parsons

Services
- Emergency department: Yes
- Beds: 252 (2022)

History
- Opened: Incorporated 1871, Reopened 1886

Links
- Website: www.mountauburnhospital.org
- Lists: Hospitals in the United States

Mount Auburn Hospital (MAH) is a community hospital with a patient capacity of about 200 beds in Cambridge, Massachusetts. Its main campus is located at 330 Mount Auburn St, in the neighborhood of West Cambridge. It is an affiliated teaching hospital of Harvard Medical School.

== History ==
=== 19th century ===
Mt. Auburn Hospital was founded by Civil War era nurse and administrator Emily Elizabeth Parsons as the first hospital in Cambridge in 1866. It closed in 1872, but reopened in 1886.

=== 20th century ===
Until 1947, it was known as Cambridge Hospital.

In 1993 an announced merger between MGH and Brigham caused MAH to evaluate a strategic alliance of its own. In 1996 MAH agreed to a merger with Beth Israel and New England Deaconess hospitals, the two of which merged into Beth Israel Deaconess Medical Center.

=== 21st century ===
2002 saw Mount Auburn's provision to introduce a more automated physician order entry (POE) system throughout the hospital, starting with the labor and delivery ward.

In November 2008, the hospital opened the $80 million six-floor, 274,000 square feet (25,500 m^{2}) Frank Stanton Building expansion project at its main 330 Mount Auburn Campus.

In 2012 Mount Auburn Hospital's cardiac surgery received a top 100 rating from HealthGrades. In the same year a smaller satellite facility affiliated with the hospital was established in Waltham.

In late 2014, Mount Auburn signed a $110 million contract with Epic Systems to implement a new electronic health record platform, called MyChart, for patients.

In 2017 Mount Auburn Hospital announced that it would join with Beth Israel Deaconess Medical Center, Lahey Hospital & Medical Center, New England Baptist Hospital, and Anna Jaques Hospital to form Beth Israel Lahey Health It was completed March 1, 2019.

== Overview ==
MAH is an affiliate of Harvard University Health Services (HUHS).

The hospital is ranked by U.S. News & World Report. According to the publication, MAH is "high-performing" when it comes to treating heart attack, heart failure, diabetes, stroke, and chronic obstructive pulmonary disease.

In 2018 it was ranked as the 22nd largest hospital in facility in Massachusetts. It employs roughly 1,500 people (2022), has an estimated 600 affiliated doctors and admits more than 10,300 patients annually, up from 28,000 (2015).

=== Leadership ===
- Jeanette Clough, CEO 1998–present

=== Radiology department ===
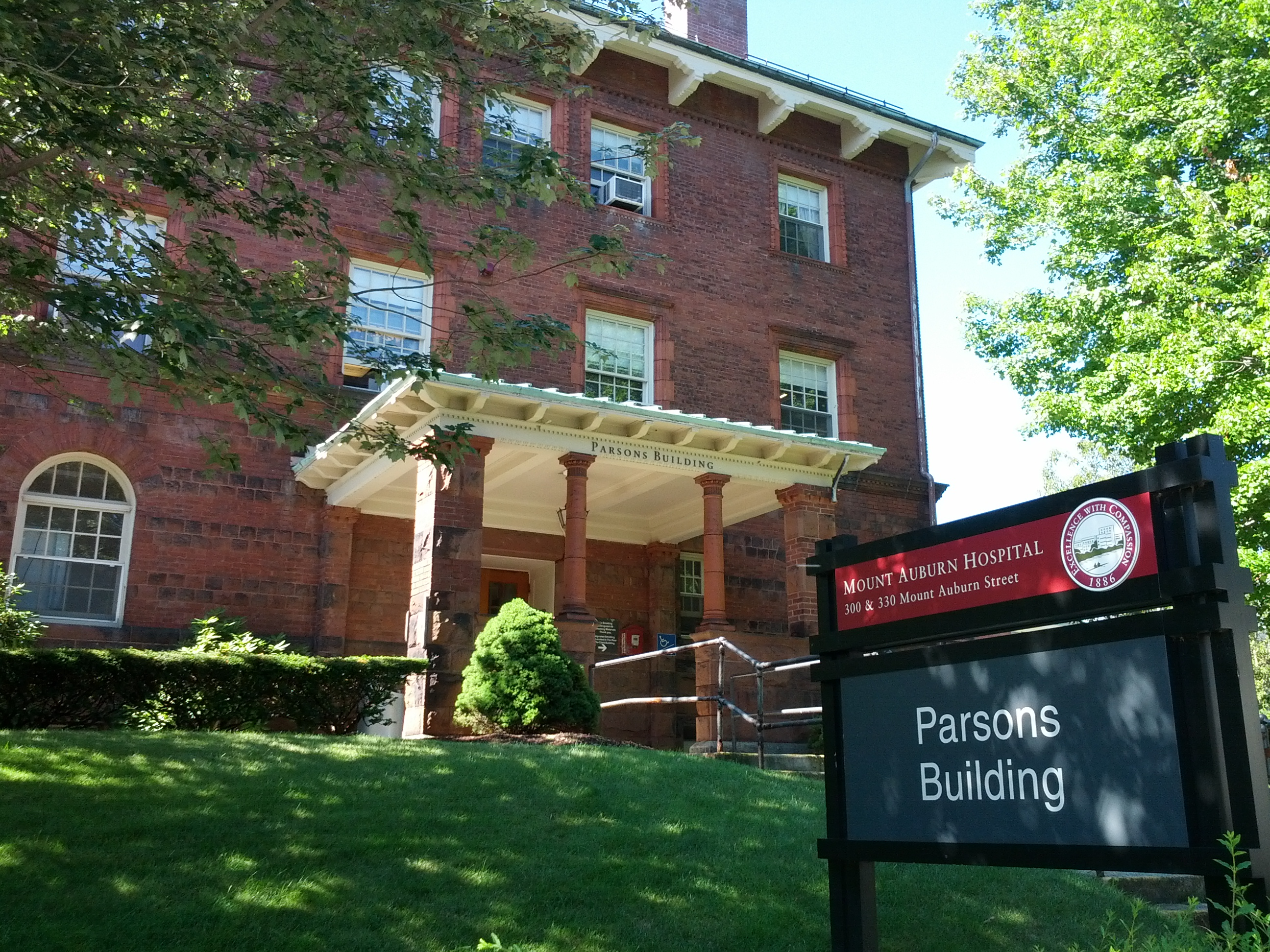
Mount Auburn Hospital's first building, the Parsons Building, built 1886

The Department of Radiology was founded by Dr. Richard Schatzki. He was the first to describe the most common cause of difficulty swallowing, now known as the Schatzki ring. The department has an active radiology residency program.

== Notable patients ==
=== Births ===
- King Bhumibol Adulyadej (1927–2016), former King of Thailand. His father, Prince Mahidol Adulyadej of Siam, Prince of Songkla, was attending Harvard as a public health and medical student.
- Steven Wright (born 1955), American award-winning comedian

=== Deaths ===
- John Strugnell (1930–2007), English academic and early translator of the Dead Sea Scrolls.
