= Bethany Deaconess Hospital =

- U.S. National Register of Historic Places
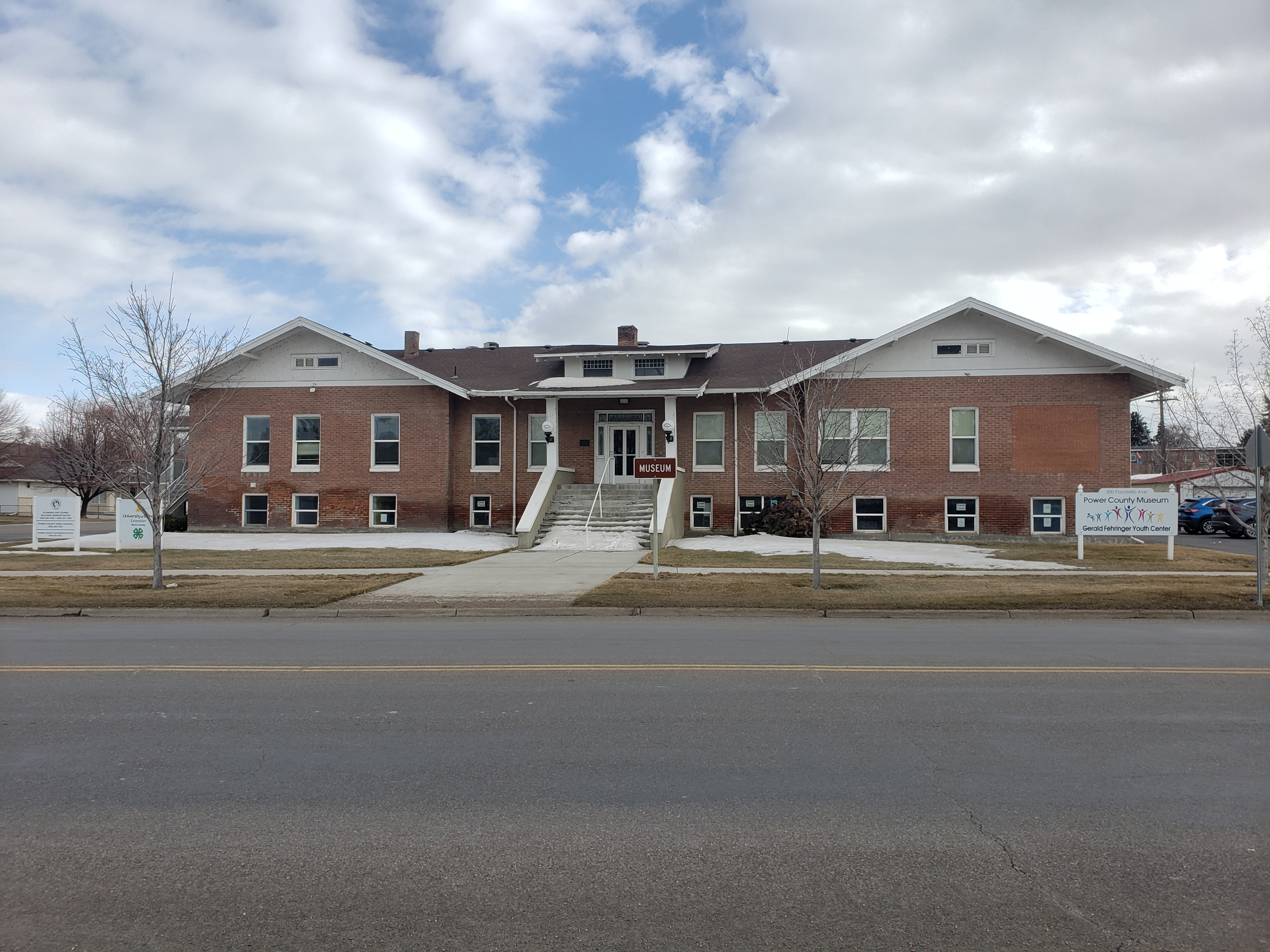

- Location within Idaho
- Location: 500 Pocatello Highway Ave., American Falls, Idaho
- Coordinates: 42°47′02″N 112°50′53″W
- Area: less than one acre
- Built: 1926-27
- Built by: S. H. Anderson
- Architect: John Hayward
- Architectural style: Bungalow/craftsman
- NRHP reference No.: 95000507
- Added to NRHP: April 27, 1995

The Bethany Deaconess Hospital, at 500 Pocatello Highway Ave. in American Falls, Idaho, was built in 1926–27. It was listed on the National Register of Historic Places in 1995.

Building plans were developed by Idaho Falls contractor John Hayward with input from American Falls doctor C. F. Schlitz, who became the hospital's attending physician. It was run by Bethany Deaconess nurses. It was built as a 21-room hospital which could accommodate 42 patients; patients from the county were charged $2.50 per day and out-of-county patients $3.00.

After Schlitz died in 1931, it was renamed as Schiltz Memorial Hospital.

The building was bought in 1973 by the local American Legion post, and at time of National Register nomination used it for a private meeting hall and lounge, with occasional rental for social functions. It is now used as the Power County Museum.
