= Beth Israel Deaconess Hospital – Milton =

Community hospital in Milton, Massachusetts

- Beth Israel Lahey Health

Geography
- Location: Milton, Massachusetts, United States
- Coordinates: 42°15′04.61″N 71°04′37.18″W

Organization
- Type: Community

Services
- Emergency department: Yes
- Beds: 102

History
- Former name: Milton Hospital
- Opened: 1903

Links
- Website: bidmilton.org
- Lists: Hospitals in Massachusetts

Beth Israel Deaconess Hospital – Milton (commonly shortened as BID Milton, also known by its former name Milton Hospital) is a mid-size non-profit community hospital located in Milton, Massachusetts. A member of Beth Israel Lahey Health, in 2022 the hospital had 102 beds, discharged 5,335 inpatients, and operated with total revenues of $136 million at a deficit of $14 million.

== History ==
Founded in 1903, Milton Hospital began operations as a convalescent home. 1903 saw the Cunningham Foundation offer a portion of the Edward Cunningham Estate for future development and expansion of the services offered at that time. Milton Hospital was officially incorporated in 1903 with just nine beds.

In 1944, the current site of Milton Hospital was finalized with the purchase of land from the Pierce Estate. The newly constructed hospital building finally opened its doors in 1950. In 1987, a new patient service wing and main entrance were added. Renovations provided space for several departments, namely; emergency department, ambulatory care unit, diagnostic services department, intensive care/coronary care unit, operating suites and a conference area.

== Affiliations ==
Now an affiliate of Beth Israel Deaconess Medical Center (BIDMC), Milton Hospital has produced the following specialized programs:

- Rapid Cardiac Transfer
- Geriatrics
- Emergency Care
- Cardiovascular Health
- Prostate Health
