= Samuel Shem =

American dramatist

Samuel Shem is the pen name of the American psychiatrist Stephen Joseph Bergman (born 1944). His main works are The House of God and Mount Misery, both fictional but close-to-real first-hand descriptions of the training of doctors in the United States.

Of Jewish descent, Bergman was a Rhodes Scholar at Balliol College, Oxford in 1966, and was tutored by Denis Noble FRS, cardiac physiologist and later head of the Oxford Cardiac Electrophysiology Group. In an address to Noble's retirement party at Balliol, he related that Noble's response to Bergman's attempt to become a writer was to ply him with copious sherry. He graduated from Harvard College and Harvard Medical School.

He was an intern at Beth Israel Hospital (subsequently renamed Beth Israel Deaconess Medical Center), an experience that inspired his book The House of God.

As of 2017, Bergman is a member of the faculty of the New York University School of Medicine at NYU Langone Medical Center.

Shem's play Bill W. and Dr. Bob had an Off Broadway run at New World Stage in New York City. It ran for 132 performances and closed on June 10, 2007. The New York Times called it "an insightful new play."

== Bibliography ==
- The House of God (1978)
- Fine (1985)
- Mount Misery (ISBN 0-8041-1555-9) (1997)
- Bill W. and Dr. Bob (play on alcoholism and the founders of Alcoholics Anonymous - Bill W. and Dr Bob)(with Janet Surrey, 1990)
- We Have to Talk: Healing Dialogues Between Men and Women (with Janet Surrey, 1999, ISBN 0-465-09114-8)
- The Spirit of the Place (ISBN 978-0-87338-942-6, June 2008)
- At the Heart of the Universe (2016)
- Man's 4th Best Hospital (2019)
- Our Hospital (2023)
