= Winchester Hospital =

Hospital in Massachusetts

- Beth Israel Lahey Health

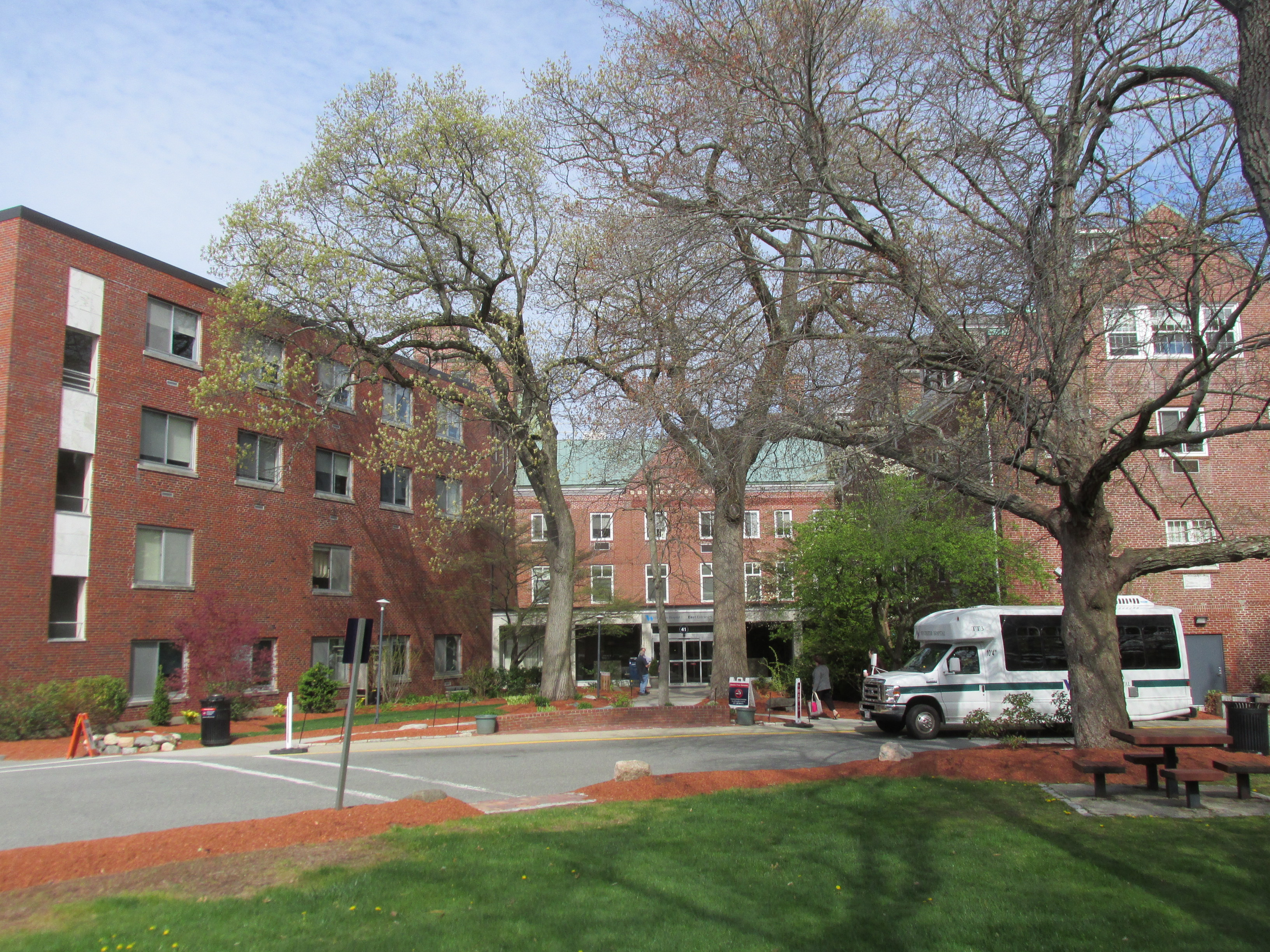

Geography
- Location: Winchester, Massachusetts, United States
- Coordinates: 42°27′57.0″N 71°7′19.7″W

Organization
- Type: Community

Services
- Emergency department: Yes

History
- Opened: 1912

Links
- Lists: Hospitals in Massachusetts

Winchester Hospital located in Winchester, Massachusetts is a notable hospital in northwest suburb of the city of Boston, United States. It is affiliated with Beth Israel Lahey Health. The hospital provides inpatient service and integrated home care to the population residing in Winchester, Woburn, Reading, Wilmington, North Reading, Stoneham, Burlington, Billerica, Medford, Malden, Wakefield, Tewksbury and several other surrounding communities.

== History ==
The hospital had a humble beginning in 1912 when the Winchester Visiting Nurse Association opened the first Winchester Hospital. It was a 12-bed hospital on Washington Street. As the necessity to build a larger hospital became apparent, a 5.5-acre (2.2 ha) tract of land was bought by 1914, with the money raised by canvassing in the town and donation by a group of businessmen. A new, 44-bed hospital was opened on May 18, 1917. The hospital has since expanded to 206 beds, and continues to be one of Massachusetts premiere hospitals for nursery care.

== Area Served ==
- North Reading
- Reading
- Stoneham
- Wilmington
- Winchester

== See also ==
- Winchester Hospital Chiropractic Center
- List of hospitals in Massachusetts
