= Beth Israel Lahey Health =

Health system in New England

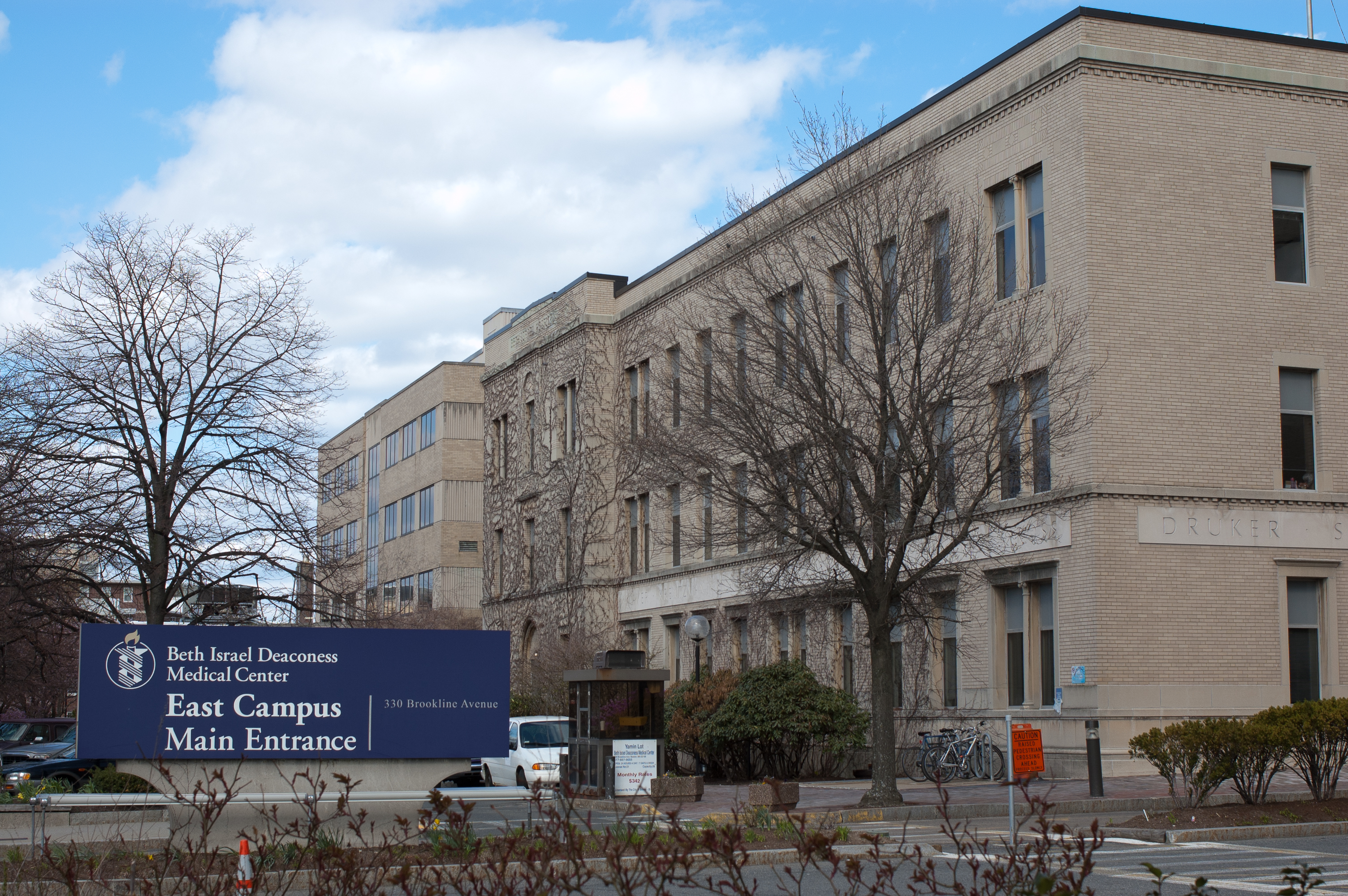
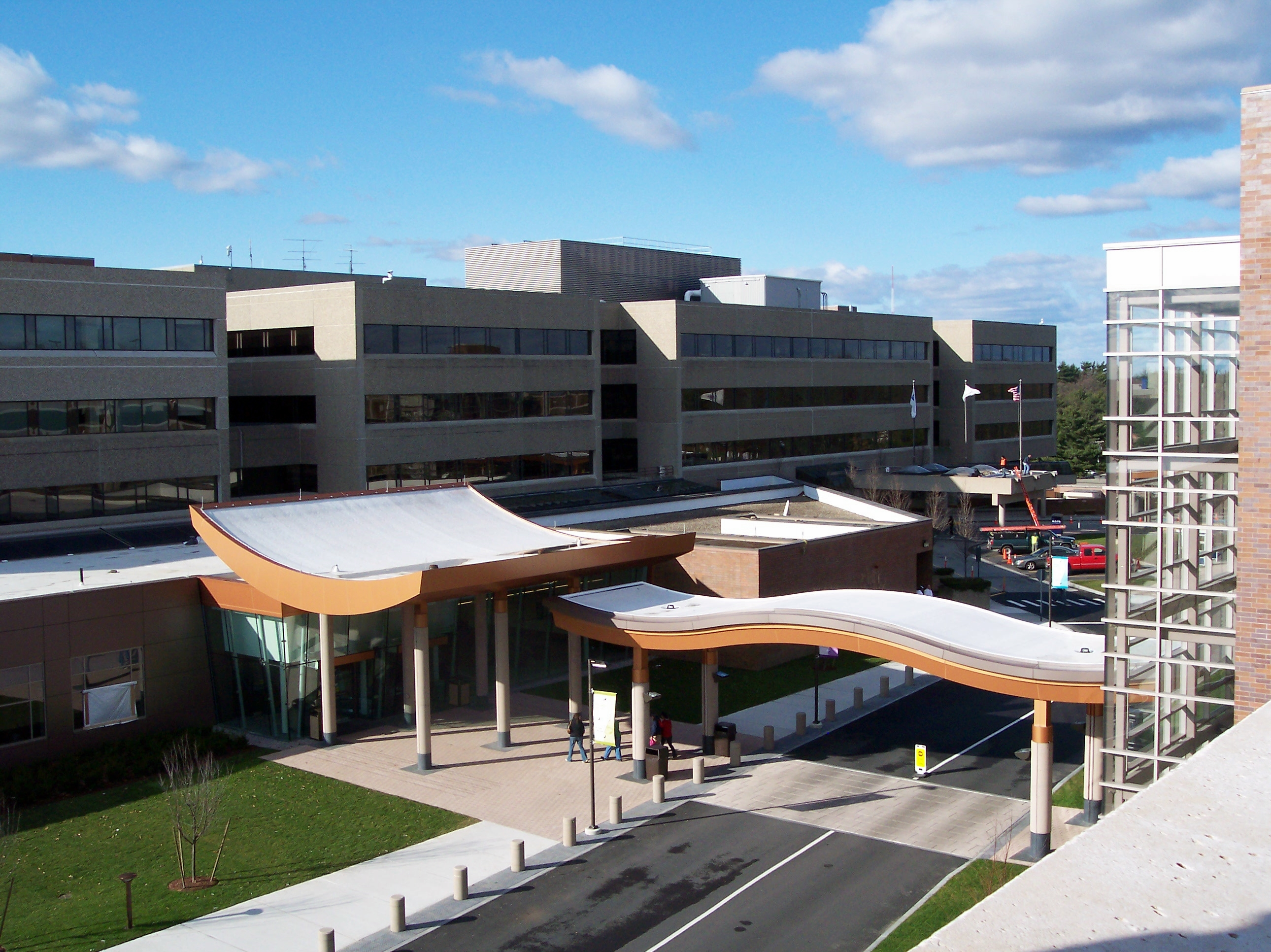
- Founding members Beth Israel Deaconess Medical Center (top) and Lahey Hospital & Medical Center (bottom)
- Type: Private
- Industry: Healthcare
- Founded: 2017; 9 years ago
- Headquarters: Cambridge, Massachusetts, US
- Number of locations: 11 Hospitals (2024)
- Areas served: Massachusetts; New Hampshire
- Key people: Kevin Tabb, MD (CEO)
- Revenue: $7.7 billion (2023)
- Net income: $451.2 million (2023)
- Number of employees: 39,000
- Website: bilh.org

Beth Israel Lahey Health, Inc. (BILH) is a non-profit integrated health system based in Massachusetts, with one location in New Hampshire. Formed through the 2019 merger of two large Massachusetts health systems led by Beth Israel Deaconess Medical Center and Lahey Hospital & Medical Center, it is the largest health system in Massachusetts by count of hospitals, with 10 acute-care hospitals in the state.

== History ==
Beth Israel Deaconess (BID) and Lahey Health first publicly expressed their intention to merge in 2013, when they shared with employees that the two systems were in talks with each other and several physician groups, including Atrius Health, to form an alliance that could see a formal merger between the hospital systems. While talks were off and on for years, the two systems repeatedly expressed their desire to merge, largely to compete with Mass General Brigham (known as Partners Healthcare at the time), which was a dominating force in the Massachusetts health care market.

Talk about a merger became more serious in 2017, when BID and Lahey appeared to resolve a dispute over the leadership structure of the potential system, which had halted talks in the past. As part of the agreement, BID's CEO, Kevin Tabb, would become the combined system's CEO, Lahey's board chairwoman would become the combined system's chairwoman, and the system's board as a whole would consist of an equal split of members from each system. Additionally, three small hospitals outside of either system joined the talks: New England Baptist Hospital of Boston, Mount Auburn Hospital of Cambridge, and Anna Jaques Hospital of Newburyport. The final merger agreement was signed by the hospitals in July 2017.

State and federal regulators officially approved the deal in January 2018. Maura Healey, then Massachusetts attorney general, placed requirements on the new health system, including that they cap price increases for their first seven years, make efforts to increase the number of Medicaid patients they serve and ensure their doctors accept Medicaid, and that they spend $72 million over eight years to support health resources for low-income and mental health patients, among other requirements. The system was required to pay for an independent firm to monitor their compliance with the Attorney General's deal for 10 years. Following this deal, the newly formed health system was named Beth Israel Lahey Health (BILH).

BILH's first interstate expansion occurred in 2023, when the system acquired Exeter Hospital in Exeter, New Hampshire.

== Services ==
=== Hospitals ===
This is a list of BILH's acute care hospitals in Massachusetts and New Hampshire. Worthy of note is that the Commonwealth of Massachusetts considers Addison Gilbert Hospital and Beverly Hospital to be two campuses of one hospital called Northeast Hospital. However, most of BILH's public facing information regards them as separate hospitals. These are considered separate entities for the purposes of this list.

BILH Hospitals
Name	City	State	Type
Addison Gilbert Hospital	Gloucester	Massachusetts	Community
Anna Jaques Hospital	Newburyport	Massachusetts	Community
Beth Israel Deaconess Hospital – Milton	Milton	Massachusetts	Community
Beth Israel Deaconess Hospital – Needham	Needham	Massachusetts	Community
Beth Israel Deaconess Hospital – Plymouth	Plymouth	Massachusetts	Community
Beth Israel Deaconess Medical Center	Boston	Massachusetts	Academic
Beverly Hospital	Beverly	Massachusetts	Community
Exeter Hospital	Exeter	New Hampshire	Community
Lahey Hospital & Medical Center	Burlington	Massachusetts	Teaching
Mount Auburn Hospital	Cambridge	Massachusetts	Teaching
New England Baptist Hospital	Boston	Massachusetts	Specialty
Winchester Hospital	Winchester	Massachusetts	Community

=== Other services ===
As an integrated care system, BILH offers a variety of services, including primary care, urgent care, assisted living, and emergency medical services.
