= Beth Israel Deaconess Medical Center =

Hospital in Boston, Massachusetts, US

- Beth Israel Lahey Health

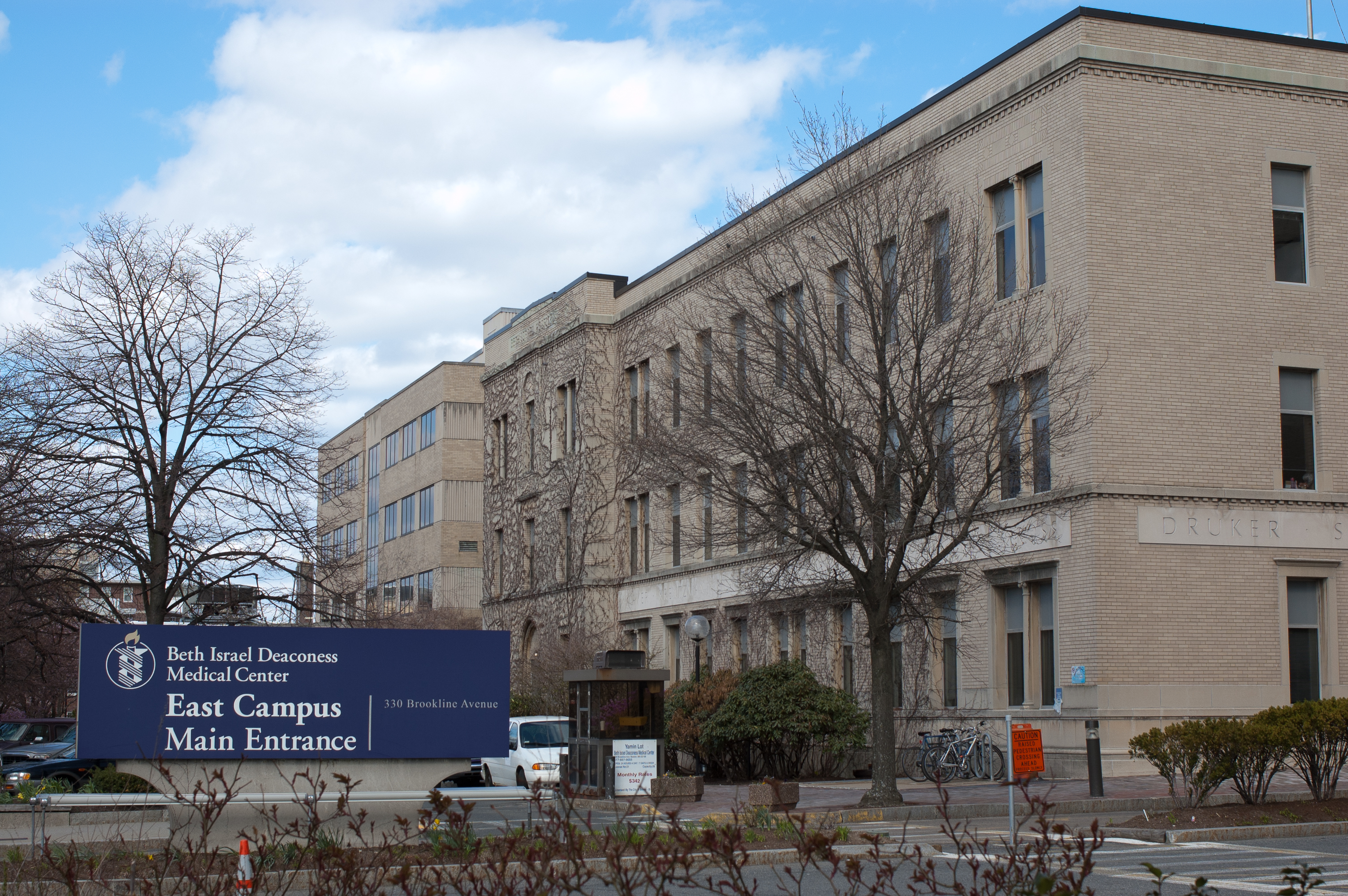

Geography
- Location: Boston, Massachusetts, U.S.
- Coordinates: 42.3366°N 71.1094°W

Organisation
- Care system: Private
- Type: Teaching
- Affiliated university: Harvard Medical School

Services
- Emergency department: Level I Trauma Center
- Beds: 766

Helipads
- Helipad: (FAA LID: 36MA)
Number	Length		Surface
Number	ft	m	Surface
H1	49	15	Rooftop

History
- Founded: Deaconess: 1896; Beth Israel: 1916; Merged: 1996; Founding member of Beth Israel Lahey Health, a new health care system formed in March 2019
- Closed: Bus 8, 19, 47, 60, 65, CT2, CT3; Green Line D, E

Links
- Website: www.bidmc.org
- Lists: Hospitals in U.S.

Beth Israel Deaconess Medical Center (BIDMC) in Boston, Massachusetts, is a teaching hospital of Harvard Medical School and one of the founding members of Beth Israel Lahey Health. It was formed out of the 1996 merger of Beth Israel Hospital (founded in 1916 by the Jewish community) and New England Deaconess Hospital (founded in 1896 by Methodist deaconesses). Among independent teaching hospitals, Beth Israel Deaconess Medical Center has ranked in the top three recipients of biomedical research funding from the National Institutes of Health. Research funding totals nearly $200 million annually. BIDMC researchers run more than 850 active sponsored projects and 200 clinical trials. The Harvard-Thorndike General Clinical Research Center, the oldest clinical research laboratory in the United States, has been located on this site since 1973.

== Overview ==
BIDMC is one of the largest hospitals in New England. It is affiliated with Joslin Diabetes Center, and is a research partner of Dana-Farber/Harvard Cancer Center, the largest cancer institution in the country. The hospital is part of the Boston MedFlight consortium and supports a Level I trauma center through the use of its rooftop helipad.

Beth Israel Deaconess Medical Center has affiliates in the Boston-area towns of Needham, Milton, Plymouth, Chestnut Hill, Chelsea and Lexington, as well as through numerous primary care practices and community health centers.

BIDMC is the official hospital of the Boston Red Sox. Under the 32-year leadership of Mitchell T. Rabkin, it was the first hospital in the nation to create and adopt a Patient Bill of Rights.

Peter J. Healy joined Beth Israel Deaconess Medical Center as president in 2017.

== History ==
New England Deaconess Hospital was founded In 1896 by Methodist deaconesses to care for Boston's residents. The revival of the office of the Christian deaconess, which started in Germany in 1836, was spurred by a group of Christian women dedicating themselves to the care of the sick and the poor. The first 14-bed infirmary was opened in a converted five-story brownstone at 691 Massachusetts Avenue. Although the hospital was originally staffed by the deaconesses, in 1922 it added a permanent medical and surgical staff. In 1927, the New England Deaconess Association opened the Palmer Memorial Hospital, a cancer treatment facility. During the 1960s, Deaconess' residency programs gained accreditation and it affiliated with Harvard Medical School. Deaconess had a leading role in the early studies of the cause, course and treatment of AIDS. Deaconess was also a pioneer in organ transplantation and immunological research.

During an era of religious separatism and anti-Semitism, Boston's Jewish community founded Beth Israel Hospital in 1916 to meet the needs of the growing Jewish immigrant population. Its first hospital on Townsend Street in Roxbury held 45 beds. The new hospital addressed the needs of immigrants who spoke Yiddish without speaking English and for patients who kept a kosher diet. In 1928, Beth Israel established relationships with Tufts University and the Harvard Medical School and relocated to a new facility in the Longwood area of Boston. During the Depression, Beth Israel was one of only two hospitals in Boston that treated welfare recipients. Researchers at Beth Israel discovered vascular endothelial growth factor (VEGF) in 1983.

The two neighboring hospitals merged in 1996, continuing the patient care, educational and research components of both predecessors. In 2003, BIDMC researchers identified the source of preeclampsia, a life-threatening complication of pregnancy.

In January 2014, Jordan Hospital joined the Beth Israel Deaconess Medical Center family of hospitals and became Beth Israel Deaconess Hospital – Plymouth. It was founded in 1899 when a group of leading citizens from Plymouth saw a need to build a hospital to serve residents and pursued the idea of "a hospital on the hill". They approached retail tycoon, philanthropist, and summer resident Eben Jordan of Jordan Marsh & Company, who donated $20,000 to build what was to become Jordan Hospital. In December 1903, Jordan Hospital opened its doors to its first patients and has remained a community hospital ever since. It remains a private, not-for-profit hospital serving the communities of Bourne, Carver, Duxbury, Halifax, Kingston, Lakeville, Pembroke, Plympton, Plymouth, Marshfield, Middleboro, Sandwich and Wareham.

=== Boston Marathon Bombing ===
BIDMC received and cared for 21 victims of the April 2013 Boston Marathon bombing, as well as receiving Dzhokhar Tsarnaev after he was arrested by police. Of the 21 victims received, 17 had serious injuries and seven required emergency surgery. Tamerlan Tsarnaev was also brought to BIDMC, where attempts were made to resuscitate him, and where he was ultimately pronounced dead.

=== Merger with Lahey Hospital & Medical Center ===
In January 2017, The Boston Globe reported on a letter of intent for a merger between Beth Israel Deaconess and Lahey Hospital & Medical Center, with this partnership creating the largest hospital merger in more than 20 years. The combined system would be a counteraction to Partners HealthCare, Massachusetts' largest network of hospitals and doctors with a market share of 22% in the eastern part of the state.

In December 2017, a group called the Make Healthcare Affordable Coalition came out in opposition to the proposed merger of Lahey Health and Beth Israel Deaconess Medical Center stating that the "mega merger" would lead to higher costs and the closing of health clinics serving minority communities.

In March 2019, Beth Israel Lahey Health was formed by the merger of Lahey Health and Beth Israel Deaconess Medical Center. Beth Israel Lahey Health is composed of Addison Gilbert Hospital, Anna Jaques Hospital, Beth Israel Deaconess Medical Center, Beth Israel Deaconess Hospital—Milton, Beth Israel Deaconess Hospital—Needham, Beth Israel Deaconess Hospital—Plymouth, Beverly Hospital, Lahey Hospital & Medical Center, Lahey Medical Center-Peabody, Mount Auburn Hospital, New England Baptist Hospital, and Winchester Hospital.

=== Partnership with Dana-Farber ===
In September 2023, the Dana–Farber Cancer Institute announced a new partnership with BIDMC and plans to build a new standalone hospital focused on treating adult cancer patients. This includes a departure from their current home and longtime affiliation with Brigham and Women's Hospital, which had been recognized among U.S. News & World Report's top cancer care facilities for 23 consecutive years.

== Structure and campuses ==
Since the Beth Israel–Deaconess merger, the hospital has consisted of two campuses, the East (former Beth Israel) and the West (former Deaconess). The East Campus retained most primary care, outpatient, clinical and administrative functions, while the emergency department, inpatient care, the department of human resources, and many specialists are located on the West Campus. The medical center has more than 6,000 full-time employees.

The merger coincided with the completion of the ten-story Clinical Center, located at the corner of Brookline and Longwood Avenues, in space formerly occupied by the Massachusetts College of Art. The Clinical Center houses most of the hospital's outpatient services. The East Campus is located at 330 Brookline Avenue in the Longwood Medical Area.

The nation's oldest clinical research laboratory, the Harvard–Thorndike Laboratory, has been at this site since 1973.

The West Campus is located nearly diagonally across the street, at 1 Deaconess Road. A number of other non-clinical, administrative offices (e.g. payroll, accounts payable, telecommunications) are located offsite in offices scattered throughout the area.

== Major affiliates ==
- One of the teaching hospitals of Harvard Medical School
- Affiliated with Joslin Diabetes Center
- Research partner of the Dana-Farber Harvard Cancer Center
- Level I trauma center verified by the American College of Surgeons
- Part of the consortium of hospitals which operates Boston MedFlight
- In 2003, the institution formed a partnership with the Boston Red Sox, becoming the official hospital of the team.

== In popular culture ==
A stylized version of Beth Israel Hospital serves as the setting for the novel The House of God, a satirical account of one physician's training in the Harvard medical system in the 1970s.

The hospital's intensive care unit served as the basis and subject of Frederick Wiseman's 1989 documentary Near Death. The film explores the "complex interrelationships among patients, families, doctors, nurses, hospital staff, and religious advisors" as they are confronted with the implications of continuing life-sustaining treatment on individual patients approaching the end of their lives. It is Wiseman's longest documentary at a length of six hours, and is regarded as one of the longest cinematic films of all time.

== Notable faculty and alumni ==
- James B. Aguayo-Martel, MD, MPH, developer of MR microscopy and deuterium spectroscopy
- Stephen Bergman, author of The House of God
- William Dameshek, MD, a pioneering hematologist, founder of the journal Blood, and founder of the American Society of Hematology
- Sanjiv Chopra, MD, MACP, Professor of Medicine and Faculty Dean for Continuing Medical Education at Harvard Medical School, Senior Consultant in Hepatology at the Beth Israel Deaconess Medical Center
- Ezekiel Emanuel, MD, PhD, bioethicist at the University of Pennsylvania who was instrumental in developing the Affordable Care Act
- Jerome Groopman, chief of experimental medicine, author of Anatomy of Hope, How Doctors Think
- Mark Josephson, chairman of cardiology, one of the most influential figures in the history of electrophysiology
- Roderick MacKinnon, 2003 Nobel Prize in Chemistry "for structural and mechanistic studies of ion channels"
- Godwin Maduka, MD and founder of Las Vegas Pain Institute and Medical Center
- Joel Mark Noe, MD, pioneering reconstructive plastic surgeon who, in 1977, created the burn unit and argon laser program
- Alvaro Pascual-Leone, MD, PhD, noted neuroscientist, one of the pioneers in the use of transcranial magnetic stimulation and the director of Berenson-Allen Center for Noninvasive Brain Stimulation
- John Rowe, former chief of geriatrics, CEO of Aetna
- Chip Skowron, hedge fund portfolio manager convicted of insider trading
- Jill Stein, MD, two-time presidential candidate
- Paul Zoll, first to describe technique of electrical cardioversion in humans and eponym for the Zoll defibrillator
- Ralph de la Torre, MD, founder of BIDMC's CardioVasular Institute, later founder and current CEO of Steward Health Care

== See also ==
- List of hospitals in Massachusetts
