= Lahey Hospital & Medical Center =

Coordinates: 42°29′03.12″N 71°12′16.92″W

Lahey Clinic
- Beth Israel Lahey Health

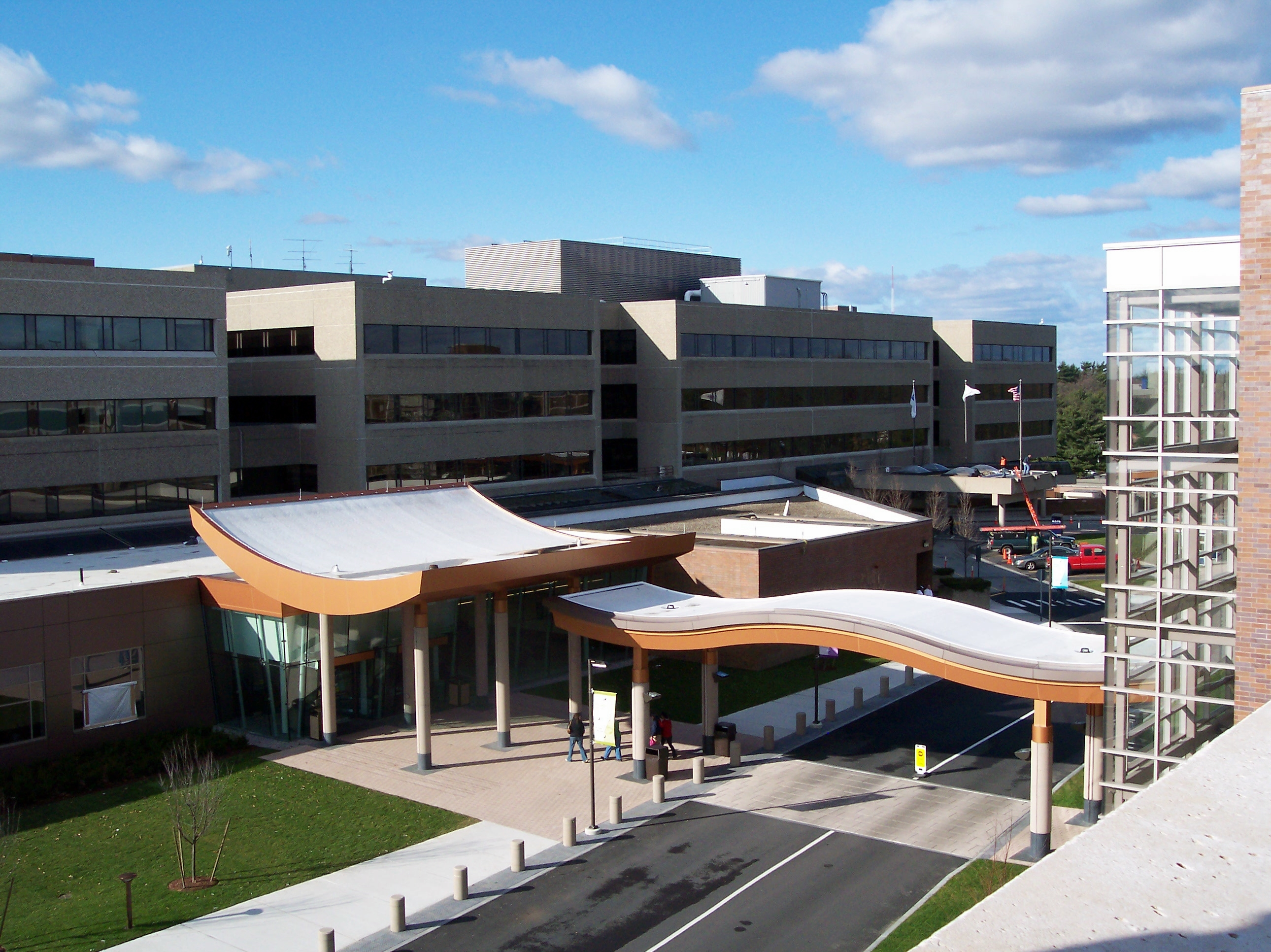
- Lahey Clinic in Burlington, Massachusetts

Geography
- Location: Burlington, Massachusetts, United States

Organization
- Care system: Medicare/Medicaid/charity
- Type: Teaching/Specialist
- Affiliated university: UMass Chan Medical School; Harvard Medical School; Boston University School of Medicine

Services
- Emergency department: Level I Trauma Center
- Beds: 334

Helipads
- Helipad: (FAA LID: 85MA)
Number	Length		Surface
Number	ft	m	Surface
H1	55	17	Concrete

History
- Founded: 1923

Links
- Website: www.lahey.org
- Lists: Hospitals in Massachusetts

The Lahey Clinic, is a physician-led nonprofit teaching hospital of UMass Chan Medical School based in Burlington, Massachusetts. The hospital was founded in Boston in 1923 by surgeon Frank H. Lahey, M.D., and is managed by Beth Israel Lahey Health. U.S. News & World Report has cited it several times on its list of "America's Best Hospitals" in the category of urology.

== History ==
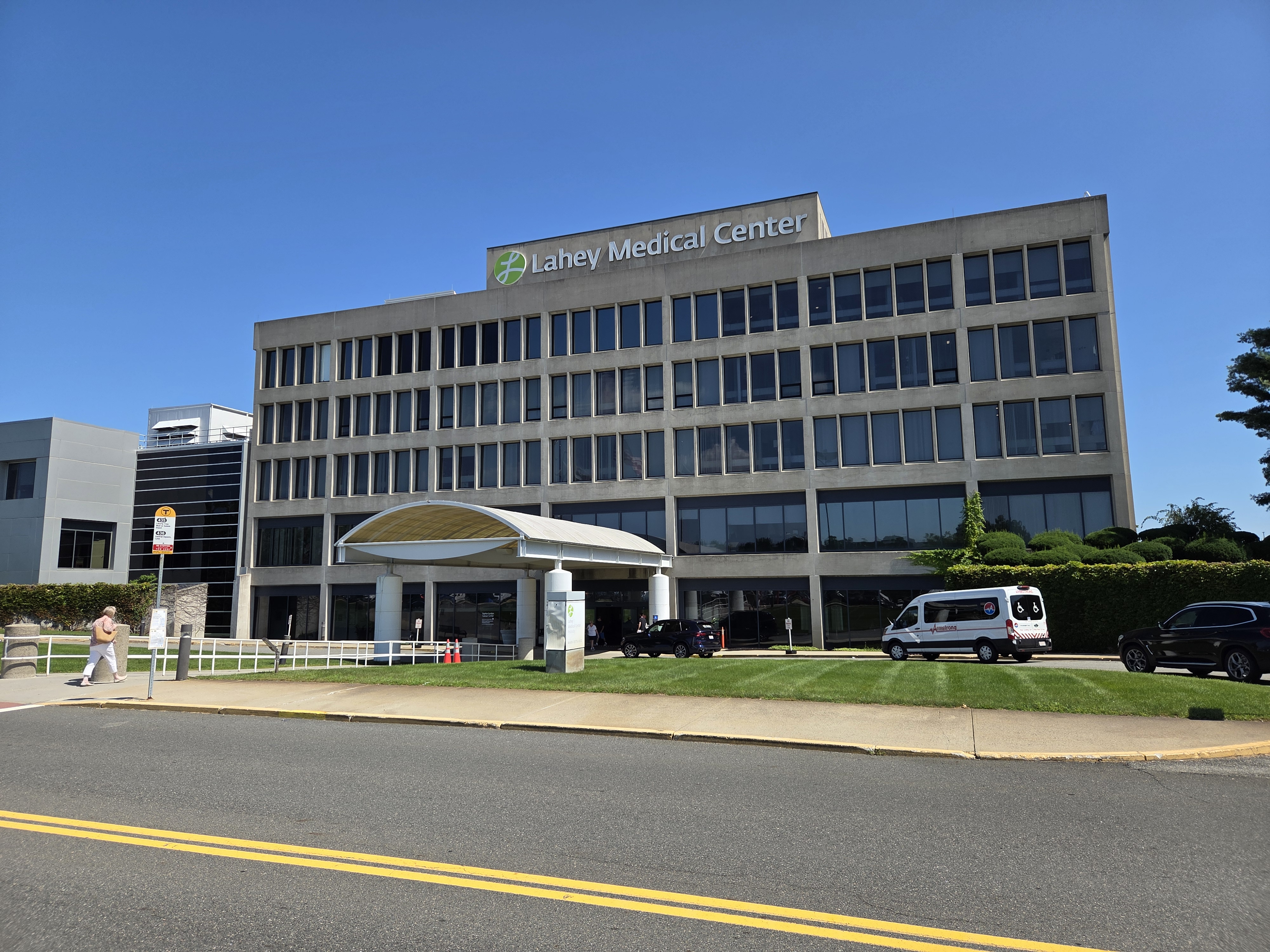
The 1994-opened Peabody facility

Lahey Clinic was founded in Boston, Massachusetts in 1923 by world-renowned combat surgeon Dr. Frank H. Lahey. It grew rapidly during its first three decades of operation, often outpacing its physical capacity in Boston's Kenmore Square. During this time, Lahey Clinic patients occupied the majority of beds at neighboring Boston hospitals including the New England Deaconess Hospital (now Beth Israel Deaconess Medical Center), and the New England Baptist Hospital. Lahey's Commonwealth Avenue facilities grew increasingly overcrowded. Faced with an expanding patient base (notable patients included former United States president John F. Kennedy), discussions for a new facility were drafted in partnership with New England Baptist Hospital, which long held close ties to Lahey Clinic. A partnership with New England Deaconess was also considered. However disagreement between administrators led Lahey officials to seek other options outside of downtown Boston. A transition to its current facility in Burlington, Massachusetts was completed in November 1980 under the leadership of then CEO, Dr. Robert E Wise. In 1994, Lahey opened an additional facility in Peabody, Massachusetts.

=== Merger with Beth Israel Deaconess ===
In January 2017, The Boston Globe reported of a letter of intent for a merger between Lahey and Beth Israel Deaconess with this partnership creating the largest hospital merger in Massachusetts in more than 20 years. The merger would include three additional hospitals: New England Baptist, Mount Auburn Hospital and Anna Jacques Hospital. The combined system was Massachusetts largest network of hospitals and doctors with a market share of 22% in the eastern part of the state. This was in competition with the then-named Partners Healthcare, which was the largest healthcare network in New England up to that time (Partners Healthcare later changed their name to Mass General Brigham).

In December 2017, a group called the Make Healthcare Affordable Coalition came out in opposition to the proposed merger of Lahey Health and Beth Israel Deaconess Medical Center citing the "mega merger" would lead to higher costs and the closing of health clinics serving minority communities.

In March 2019, Beth Israel Lahey Health was formed by the merger of Lahey Health and Beth Israel Deaconess Medical Center. Beth Israel Lahey Health is composed of Addison Gilbert Hospital, Anna Jaques Hospital, Beth Israel Deaconess Medical Center, Beth Israel Deaconess Hospital—Milton, Beth Israel Deaconess Hospital—Needham, Beth Israel Deaconess Hospital—Plymouth, Beverly Hospital, Lahey Clinic, Lahey Medical Center-Peabody, Mount Auburn Hospital, New England Baptist Hospital, and Winchester Hospital.

== Education and research ==
Lahey hosts several residency programs including Internal Medicine, General Surgery, Anesthesiology, Diagnostic Radiology, Neurology, Neurosurgery, Otolaryngology, Orthopaedic Surgery, Urology, Plastic and Reconstructive Surgery, and Dermatology. Faculty hold professorships at UMass Chan Medical School, Tufts University School of Medicine, Harvard Medical School, and Boston University School of Medicine. In addition, Lahey hosts extensive post-graduate fellowship training including: Surgical Critical Care, Colorectal Surgery, Reconstructive Urology, Cardiology/Electrophysiology, Endocrinology, Interventional Cardiology, Gastroenterology, Pulmonary and Critical Care, Interventional pulmonology, Palliative Care, Bariatric Surgery, Hand Surgery, and Ophthalmology, Interventional Neuroradiology, Breast Imaging, Interventional Radiology, Stroke, Transplant Anesthesia, & Transplant and Hepatopancreatobiliary Surgery.

== See also ==
- List of hospitals in Massachusetts
