= Deutsche Schule Valencia =

Coordinates: 39.4817°N 0.3630°W

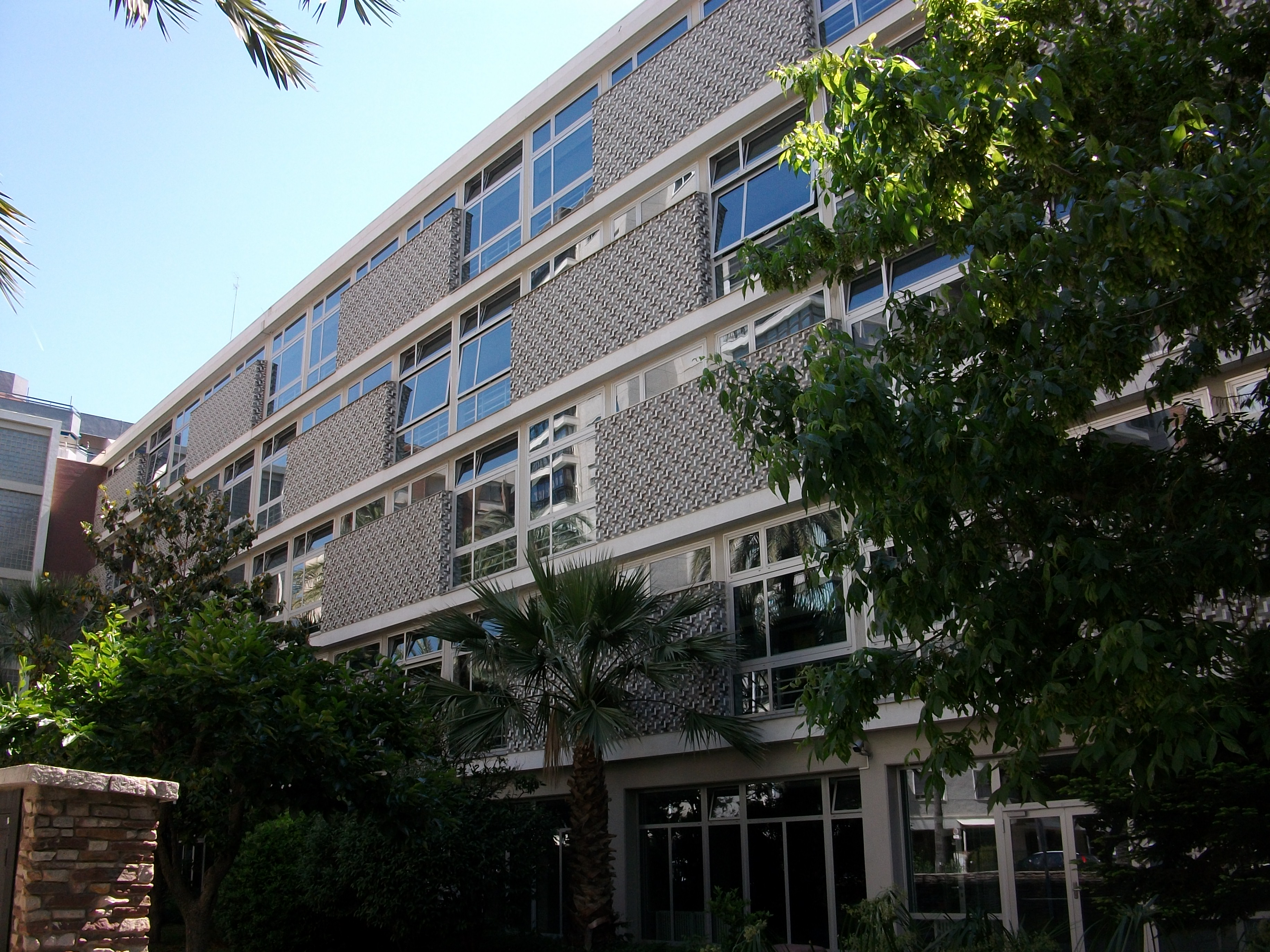
- Deutsche Schule Valencia
- Valencia; Spain

Information
- Type: German international school
- Opened: Yes
- Closed: No
- Superintendent: -
- Principal: Herr Noack
- Grades: Preschool through senior high school levels
- Newspaper: Virutas

The Deutsche Schule Valencia (DSV; Spanish: Colegio Alemán de Valencia, CAV; Catalan: Col·legi Alemany de València) is a German international school in Valencia, Spain. It serves preschool through senior high school levels.
