= Beth Israel Deaconess Hospital – Plymouth =

Hospital in Plymouth, Massachusetts

- Beth Israel Lahey Health

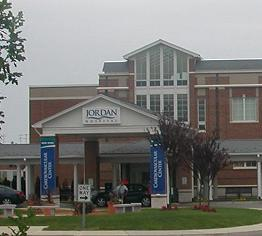
- The main entrance of BID Plymouth

Geography
- Location: Plymouth, Massachusetts, United States
- Coordinates: 41.9430°N 70.6451°W

Organization
- Type: Community

Services
- Standards: Joint Commission
- Emergency department: Yes
- Beds: 187 (2022)

Helipads
- Helipad: FAA LID: 1MA0
Number	Length		Surface
Number	ft	m	Surface
H1	40	12	Concrete

History
- Former name: Jordan Hospital
- Opened: 1901

Links
- Website: bidplymouth.org
- Lists: Hospitals in Massachusetts

Beth Israel Deaconess Hospital – Plymouth (formerly Jordan Hospital, often shortened as BID Plymouth) is a mid-sized non-profit community hospital located in Plymouth, Massachusetts. In 2022, the hospital had 187 licensed beds and reported 11,720 patient discharges and 42,367 emergency department visits.

In 1900, residents of Plymouth voted to establish a hospital in their community. The corporation formed to create the hospital received state charter the next year, and the hospital accepted its first patient in 1903. It was originally named Jordan Hospital in honor of Eben Jordan, a summer resident of Plymouth who donated $20,000 toward its establishment (equivalent to $774,000 in 2025). In 2013, Jordan Hospital joined the Beth Israel Deaconess health system, and the next year was renamed Beth Israel Deaconess Hospital – Plymouth.
