= MelroseWakefield Hospital =

- Tufts Medicine
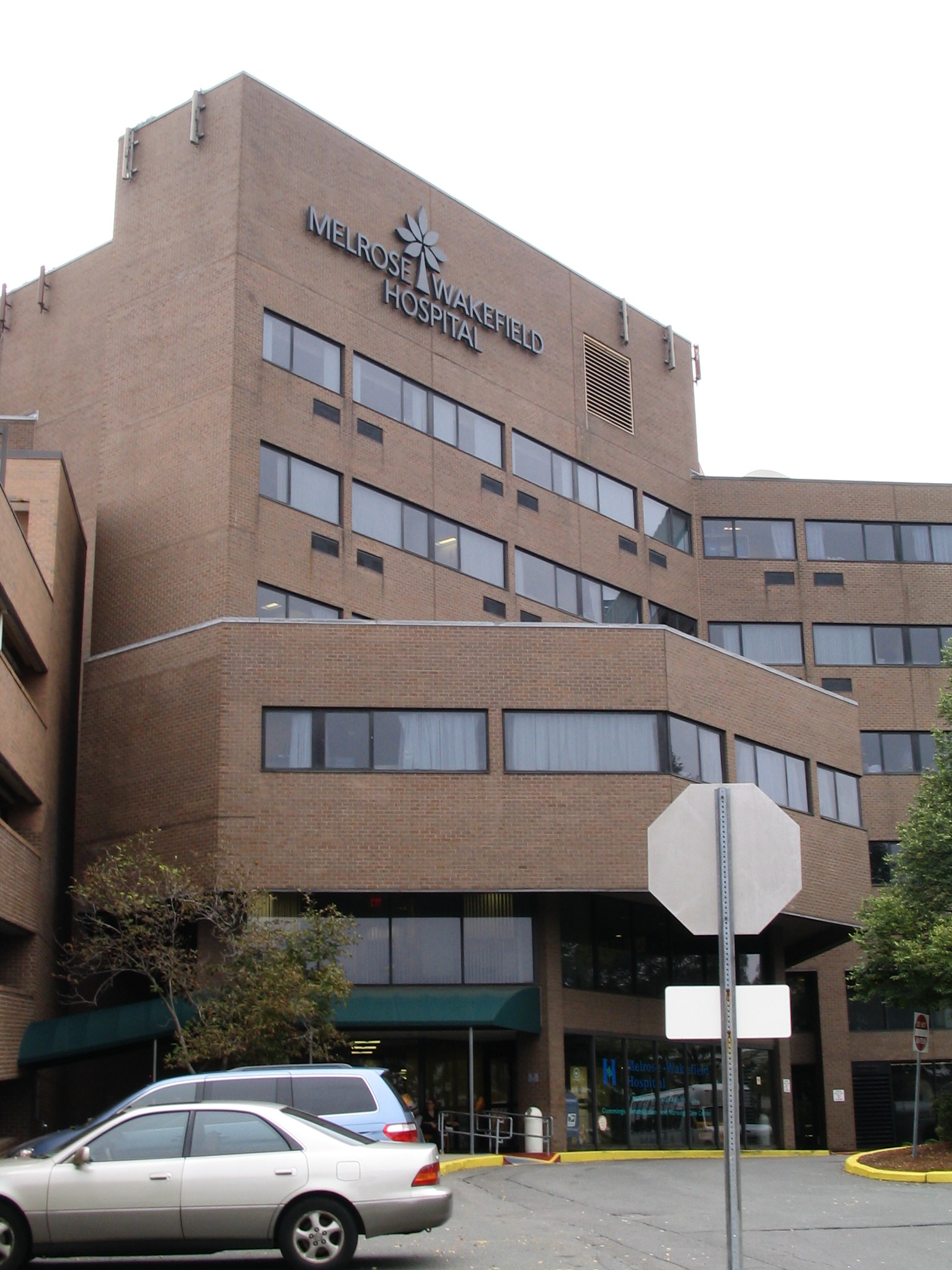
- MelroseWakefield Hospital Main Entrance

Geography
- Location: 585 Lebanon Street, Melrose, Massachusetts, United States
- Coordinates: 42°27′37″N 71°3′41″W

Organization
- Care system: Non-profit
- Type: General
- Affiliated university: Tufts University School of Medicine

Services
- Emergency department: Level III trauma center
- Beds: 150

History
- Founded: July 28, 1893
- Closed: Bus 131, 137; Haverhill Line

Links
- Website: https://www.tuftsmedicine.org/get-care/our-locations/about-melrosewakefield-hospital
- Lists: Hospitals in Massachusetts

MelroseWakefield Hospital is a 174-bed non-profit hospital located in Melrose, Massachusetts. MelroseWakefield Hospital and Lawrence Memorial Hospital of Medford function as one hospital entity with two campus locations. The MelroseWakefield Hospital campus provides many different areas of inpatient patient care including general surgery, interventional cardiovascular services, gynecology, maternity, special care nursery, orthopedics, and urology. It also offers outpatient care such as same day surgery, endoscopy, imaging and emergency services as well as serving as the region's Level III Trauma Center.

MelroseWakefield Hospital was home to the world's first cochlear implant and laser surgery and it was among the first hospitals in the country to offer same day surgery. It is also among the top 10% of hospitals in the nation for stroke care and the top 15% in the nation for heart attack treatment.

Following a failed merger attempt with Boston-based Partners HealthCare, MelroseWakefield's parent company Hallmark Health announced in June 2016 that it was seeking approval to merge with Wellforce, the operator of Tufts Medical Center in Boston and Lowell General Hospital in Lowell. As a result of the merger, Melrose-Wakefield Hospital was renamed to remove the hyphen in its name and its former parent company Hallmark Health was renamed MelroseWakefield Healthcare, a member of Wellforce.

Wellforce became Tufts Medicine on March 1, 2022. The Tufts Medicine name was selected to better reflect the system’s shared identity, its close relationship with Tufts University, and its commitment to unite the best of both academic and community health care and deliver a complete connected care experience when, where and how consumers want it.

Today it is an integrated part of the Tufts Medicine health system of which in addition to MelroseWakefield Hospital and Lawrence Memorial Hospital, includes the Lowell General Hospital and Tufts Medical Center, home health services, and physician offices and a clinically integrated care delivery network.

MelroseWakefield Hospital also has satellite locations in Medford, Reading, Stoneham, and Wakefield.

== History ==
=== 1893–1900: Beginnings ===
On July 28, 1893, the Melrose Hospital Association was established with forty-eight corporate members at the home of Decius Beebe on West Foster Street in Melrose, Massachusetts. The bylaws of the Association stated that the purpose for which the Association is constituted is to establish and maintain a hospital for the treatment and care of needy, sick and disabled persons of both sexes, and also of persons who may be able to pay for such treatment in whole or in part; such receipts to be used in the partial support of the hospital.

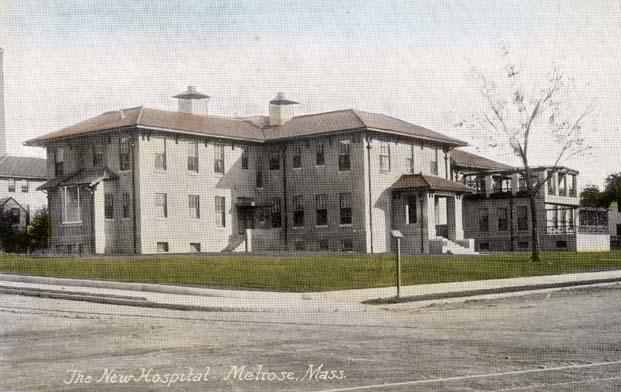
Melrose Hospital 1913

At first, the hospital was not fully self-sufficient, with the city often appropriating a sum of money towards its yearly expenses. During its beginnings, every third Sunday in May, local area churches collected contributions to support the hospital. In addition, the Hospital Guild, formed during the hospital's first year, held several fairs as fundraisers.

The first hospital was in a former residence located at 39 Oakland Street, but it soon became too small for the association's needs so it purchased and moved to a home at 75 Myrtle Street. In 1894, the association purchased a plot of land on the corner of Lebanon and Porter Streets at 585 Lebanon Street where it moved to in 1913, and remains today. Also in 1894, the Melrose Hospital School of Nursing opened in order to assure a continuous source of qualified labor.

=== 1950–1979: Expansion ===
In 1950, the trustees, administrators, and employees publicly rededicated themselves to the mission of providing a "modern, standardized and well-equipped" community hospital. A separate emergency room was created with a full-time nurse in charge and nursing assistants were integrated into hospital operations. A new surgical wing was built and the Colby Pavilion wing was completely remodeled. To deal with the Post-World War II baby boom, more maternity beds were added and the Children's Ward expanded bringing bed capacity to 187.

In 1958, the hospital officially changed its name to "Melrose-Wakefield Hospital" to reflect the increasing utilization of its services by neighboring Wakefield, Massachusetts.

In 1965, the hospital named Jane Bain, a graduate of the School of Nursing, as director of the school. Under her direction, improvements were made in the School of Nursing's curriculum and facilities and a building at 340 Main Street was purchased for classrooms and a dormitory. The curriculum was expanded to include para-medical training for patient care and surgical technicians and led to the founding of the Physical Therapy Department, Electro-Encephalography Unit and an array of ambulatory psychiatric services.

In 1967, Melrose-Wakefield opened its intensive care unit (ICU). The four-bed unit was one of the nation's first ICUs at a community hospital.

During the late-1960s and early-1970s, a shift to outpatient treatment began in hospitals throughout the nation. In response, Melrose-Wakefield introduced a number of outpatient programs, including a breast cancer detection clinic, a cardiopulmonary testing laboratory, an occupational therapy unit, and a host of services provided by home health nurses. As part of its outpatient services, the hospital became one of the first hospitals in the nation to offer same day surgery. In 1973, the hospital became the first in Massachusetts to offer a state-supervised course for the training of emergency medical technicians (EMTs)

In the mid-1970s, Dr. Geza Jako, a surgeon, medical researcher, and professor at Boston University Medical School demonstrated the first successful use of the laser as a surgical tool at Melrose-Wakefield Hospital.

In 1975, Melrose-Wakefield launched a major campaign to expand the hospital. The $11 million renovation and replacement project added a six-story medical wing containing 100 new beds and a new home for the Radiology, Emergency, and Intensive Care units. Following the expansion, Melrose-Wakefield's School of Nursing graduated its last class of nurses and closed on May 30, 1976 due to financial concerns and changing trends in nursing education.

=== 1980–2005: Evolving and partnerships ===
As the prices for health care increased in the 1980s, the hospital was forced to once again adopt a modernization program to keep up with the times. Over the next decade, the plan called for the construction of a Surgical and Ancillary Services Building on the Rowe Street side of the building and the addition of a parking garage on Lebanon Street. Later renovations included the construction a nursery and new labor and delivery suites in the Maternity Ward and the addition of the Cummings Rehabilitation Center and a cardiac catheterization laboratory.

Melrose-Wakefield also began working with its partners in the Community Hospitals of Eastern Middlesex (CHEM) organization to upgrade its shared medical facility on Montvale Avenue in Stoneham, Massachusetts. At the location, it offered radiation therapy for cancer patients and magnetic resonance imaging.

Before and After Logos

On August 1, 1996, Melrose-Wakefield joined Whidden Memorial Hospital to form UniCare Health Systems as a way to reduce overhead, streamline operations, and effectuate improvements and expansions in services where necessary. A year later, in October 1997, UniCare merged with Lawrence Memorial Hospital of Medford and Malden Hospital, to form Hallmark Health. Soon, the new company was in debt and forced to sell off Whidden Memorial Hospital to Cambridge Health Alliance. In later years, it renamed Malden Hospital as Malden Medical Center and cut services there making Melrose-Wakefield and Lawrence Memorial the only full service hospitals of Hallmark Health.

=== 2006–2011: Cardiac services and campus changes ===
In early September 2006, MelroseWakefield Hospital began offering elective angioplasty after being selected by the Massachusetts Department of Public Health (DPH) to participate in an elective angioplasty trial. The hospital was one of only seven throughout the state to participate in the "MASS COMM Trial" that studied the benefits of elective (non-emergency) angioplasty without on-site cardiac surgery back-up. The procedure, which is commonly performed in larger teaching hospitals in Boston offers patients the same care without requiring them to travel to a far distance. The Cardiac and Endovascular Center officially opened in December 2007.

On November 1, 2007, MelroseWakefield closed its Cummings Rehabilitation and Nursing Center. It had opened in December 1993 to treat patients needing hip and knee rehabilitation, as well as recovering surgery patients from New England Baptist, Beth Israel Deaconess and Mass General who had surgery and choose to recover closer to home. The 17-bed unit was replaced by a medical-surgical floor because of the hospital's need for more beds in that department. All patients were either sent to other nursing homes or home where they would be served by Hallmark Health's Visiting Nurse Association.

=== 2012–2022: Merger discussions and Tufts Medicine affiliation ===
In 2012, Boston-based Partners Healthcare began talks to merge with Melrose-Wakefield's parent, Hallmark Health. The talks soon expanded to also include South Shore Hospital in Weymouth. In early 2015, Attorney General Maura Healey blocked the South Shore merger based on fears of escalating costs and a lack of competition. Merging with Hallmark was left out of the decision and Hallmark CEO Alan MacDonald stated he remained committed to moving forward with the merger. Unable to receive approval for the Partners merger, Hallmark Health announced in June 2016 that it had voted to merge with Wellforce, the parent company of Tufts Medical Center in Boston and Lowell General Hospital in Lowell. The merger was completed on January 1, 2017.

In early 2015, Hallmark Health announced a multi-million dollar modernization plan to construct a new patient wing, a new parking garage, and to create additional surface parking lots. The surface parking would replace numerous Hospital-owned homes which currently house doctor's offices and other outpatient services. After receiving feedback from the community, the surface lots along Rowe Street in the residential area were reconsidered, however those along Porter Street remained part of the plans.

In March 2022, Wellforce announced that it would change its name to Tufts Medicine and unite its member organizations under the Tufts Medicine name, while local hospitals continued to operate under their existing names in conjunction with the Tufts Medicine identity.

In June 2022, Tufts Medicine and MelroseWakefield Hospital announced a partnership with Acadia Healthcare to build an inpatient behavioral health hospital on the site of the former Malden Hospital campus. The project followed years of uncertainty over redevelopment of the former hospital site and included plans for conservation and open space on portions of the property.

=== 2023–present: Service expansion and redevelopment ===
The Tufts Medicine Behavioral Health Hospital held a ribbon-cutting ceremony in February 2026 at 100 Hospital Road in Malden. The 144-bed hospital is operated through a joint venture between Tufts Medicine and Acadia Healthcare and was developed to provide behavioral health care for children, adolescents, adults, and older adults.

In January 2024, MelroseWakefield Hospital was designated as a Level III Trauma Center by the Massachusetts Department of Public Health.

In December 2024, Tufts Medicine announced that MelroseWakefield Hospital had been named a 2025 High Performing hospital for maternity care by U.S. News & World Report.

In July 2025, Tufts Medicine appointed William F. Wyman as President of MelroseWakefield Hospital and Lawrence Memorial Hospital. Wyman had served in the same role on an interim basis since October 2024.

In September 2025, MelroseWakefield Hospital announced that it had performed pulsed field ablation procedures for atrial fibrillation using intracardiac echocardiography and three-dimensional mapping technology. The procedures were performed by Dr. Guy Rozen, Director of the Tufts Medical Center Electrophysiology Laboratories and Atrial Fibrillation Program, together with the MelroseWakefield cardiovascular team.
