= Cambridge Hospital (Massachusetts) =

Coordinates: 42.3748°N 71.1048°W

Cambridge Health Alliance Cambridge Hospital Campus
- Cambridge Health Alliance

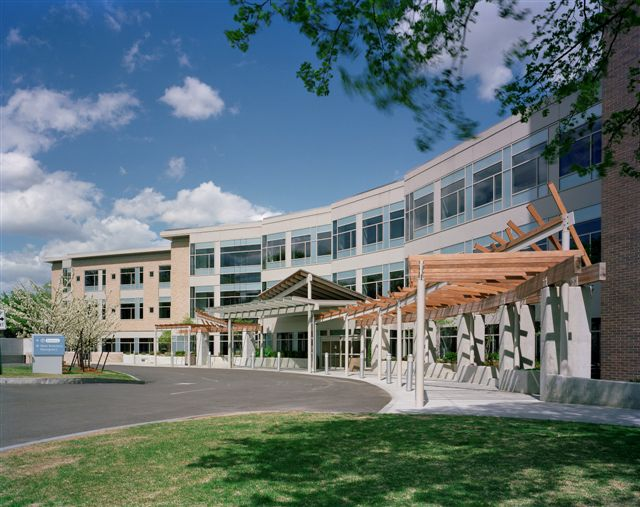
- Entrance to the Cambridge Hospital campus

Geography
- Location: 1493 Cambridge Street, Cambridge, Massachusetts, United States

Organization
- Care system: Public
- Type: Teaching
- Affiliated university: Harvard Medical School

Services
- Emergency department: Yes

History
- Opened: 1917

Links
- Website: http://www.challiance.org/Locations/CambridgeHospitalcampus.aspx
- Lists: Hospitals in Massachusetts

Cambridge Hospital is a community teaching hospital located in Cambridge, Massachusetts. It is one of three hospitals that are parts of Cambridge Health Alliance, the others being: Everett and Somerville Hospitals.

== Services highlights ==
Community Hospital Cancer Program, Am. College of Surgeons Commission on Cancer
Primary Stroke Service, MA Department of Public Health

National Accreditation:
- Cambridge Breast Center, National Accreditation Program for Breast Centers
- CT Service, American College of Radiology
- Ultrasound Service, American College of Radiology
- Breast Imaging Center of Excellence, American College of Radiology
- Baby Friendly Hospital, National Baby Friendly Health Initiative

== Academics ==
Cambridge Health Alliance is a teaching affiliate of Harvard Medical School, Harvard T.H. Chan School of Public Health, Harvard School of Dental Medicine, and the Tufts University School of Medicine.

Training programs include:

- Harvard Internal Medicine Residency Program - The training site of Harvard Medical School Cambridge Integrated Clerkship for Harvard medical students.
- Combined Training in Internal Medicine and Occupational Medicine - a new combined four-year training program began in 2010, administered by Harvard Medical School and Harvard School of Public Health which allow residents to become board-eligible in both specialties: internal medicine and occupational (preventive) medicine and receive a Masters of Public Health Degree (MPH) at HSPH.
- Family Medicine Residency Program - affiliated with Tufts University School of Medicine. Based in Malden, Massachusetts as one of 14 nationwide residency curriculum centers using the new model of residency training called Preparing the Personal Physician for Practice (P4).
- Harvard General Psychiatry Residency Program - this is one of the four Harvard Medical School Adult Psychiatric Residencies. The department serves as a popular training site for Harvard Medical students.
- Harvard Child and Adolescent Psychiatry Training Program - this is one of the three Harvard Medical School Child Psychiatric Residencies.
- CHA also training programs in Podiatric Surgery, Dentistry, Geriatric Psychiatry, Psychology, Psychotherapy, and Psychosomatic Medicine.
