= Sreekala Bajwa =

Agricultural engineer

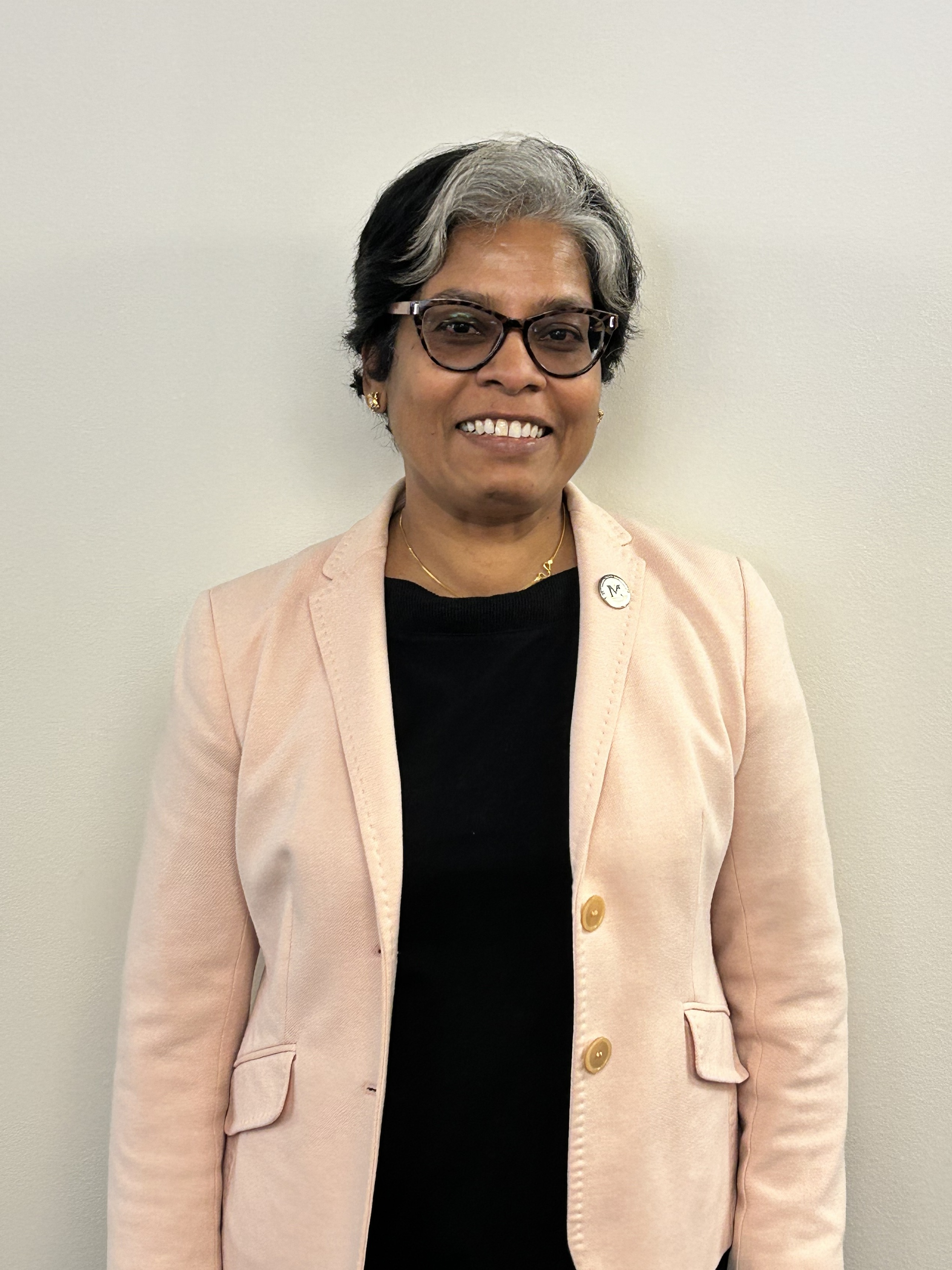
- Alma mater: Kerala Agricultural University; IIT Kharagpur; University of Illinois Urbana-Champaign
- Employer: Montana State University (2019–); North Dakota State University (2012–2018); University of Arkansas (2001–2012)

Sreekala Bajwa is the vice president for agriculture, dean of the College of Agriculture and director of the Montana Agricultural Experiment Station at Montana State University. Bajwa is a fellow of the American Society of Agricultural and Biological Engineers. She is recognized nationally and internationally for her work in the areas of remote sensing, precision agriculture for crop and soil management, and her use of agricultural byproducts in biocomposites.

== Early life and education ==
Bajwa was born in Umayanalloor, a rural town in Kerala, the southwestern-most state in India, as the third among four daughters on a small family farm. Bajwa earned a bachelor's degree from Kerala Agricultural University in Tavanur, India, a master's degree from the Indian Institute of Technology in Kharagpur, and doctoral degree from the University of Illinois Urbana-Champaign, in agricultural engineering.

== Career ==
After working as a Post-doctoral Research Associate in Agricultural Engineering at the University of Illinois Bajwa joined the University of Arkansas, serving as an assistant professor from 2001-2007, and an associate professor from 2007-2012.

In February 2012, Bajwa became Department chair of the Agricultural and Biosystems Engineering Department at North Dakota State University and professor of agricultural engineering. During her time there, NDSU became highly ranked worldwide for its work in precision agriculture. She established an undergraduate program in precision agriculture and helped to obtain support from the U.S. Department of Agriculture to establish a strong research and outreach program in Digital Agriculture at NDSU.

Bajwa became the vice president of agriculture at Montana State University as of January 14, 2019, succeeding Charles Boyer. At Montana State University Bajwa works to support the institution's land-grant mission of serving the agricultural community of Montana.

In 2024 Bajwa was also appointed to the National Agricultural Research, Extension, Education, and Economics Advisory Board (NAREEE) by the U.S. Department of Agriculture (USDA).. In 2025, she stepped into the role of chairing the Policy Board of Directors and APLU's Board on Agricultural Assembly.

Bajwa became a fellow of the American Society of Agricultural and Biological Engineers in 2017. She served as a member of its Global Engagement Executive Committee, and on its board of trustees. She has helped to organize international conferences on issues of global food, water and energy security in South Africa (2016), India (2018) and Costa Rica (2021).

== Awards and honors ==
Bajwa is the recipient of the 2022 Cyrus Hall McCormick-Jerome Increase Case Gold Medal for exceptional and meritorious engineering achievements in agriculture from the American Society of Agricultural and Biological Engineers (ASABE) the 2019 James R. and Karen A. Gilley Award for Academic Leadership from ASABE and the 2007 AMA–SHIN-NORINSHA–AAAE Young Researcher Award from the Asian Association of Agricultural Engineers.
