= Alok Kanojia =

American psychiatrist (born 1982)

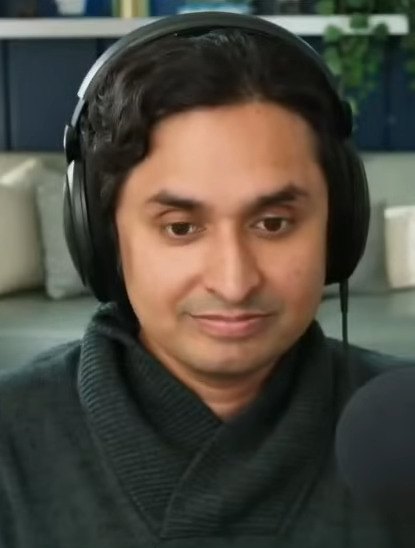
- Kanojia in 2023
- Born: Alok M. Kanojia; October 7, 1982 (age 44)
- Other name: Dr. K
- Education: University of Texas at Austin (BS); Tufts University (MD, MPH)
- Occupations: Psychiatrist; online streamer
- Years active: 2019–present

Twitch information
- Channel: HealthyGamer_GG
- Followers: 684,000

YouTube information
- Channel: HealthyGamerGG
- Subscribers: 3.3 million
- Views: 807 million
- Last updated: May 15, 2026
- Website: www.healthygamer.gg

Alok M. Kanojia (born October 7, 1982), also known as Dr. K, is an American psychiatrist and online streamer known for his channel, HealthyGamer, where he and participants discuss mental health topics. He is also a co-founder of Healthy Gamer, an organization focusing on mental health recovery.

== Early life ==
Kanojia became addicted to video games during his time at the University of Texas at Austin, leading to missed classes and bad grades. In 2003 when he was 21, Kanojia visited an ashram in India looking to become a monk, at the advice of his father. Kanojia spent a month at the ashram, where his teachers advised him to finish his degree rather than join the monastery; he would return every summer until 2010.

In India, Kanojia studied yoga and meditation, which he said gave him self-awareness and self-control required to manage his addiction and salvage his career. He graduated from the University of Texas at Austin in 2009 with a biology major. He began a placement at Tufts University School of Medicine in 2010. Kanojia received his medical degree in 2014, and subsequently started a residency at Harvard Medical School's Massachusetts General Hospital (MGH)/McLean Adult Psychiatry Residency Program.

== Career ==
=== Healthy Gamer coaching ===
After graduation, Kanojia discovered that he had many friends who were also addicted to video games. He began helping them, but he soon realized that he did not have the time to provide support to everyone. This prompted Kanojia and his wife Kruti to create a startup, Healthy Gamer, through which they could provide resources to help people overcome their addiction. He has stated that he believes gaming addiction is not typically treated productively by therapists and hopes to provide better support.

Healthy Gamer, which received support through an incubator at Boston University, trains coaches who provide non-medical advice and support to the gaming community. The coaches go through 10 weeks of free training and are paid to host individual and group sessions for paying customers, through which they explore attendees' goals and motivations and may provide guidance on meditation. The guides are not licensed medical professionals, and Kanojia encourages participants to continue with other support from trained psychiatrists or therapists.

=== Twitch livestreams ===
Kanojia began streaming on Twitch in 2019. He mainly hosts live conversations with other popular Twitch streamers wherein they discuss mental health issues. Guests of the show have included Reckful, xQc, and Pokimane. Kanojia also includes viewers who apply to be interviewed publicly on his livestreams. Kanojia's streams have been among the most popular mental health channels on Twitch due to his high-profile guests. Before participating in his livestreams, every guest signs a consent form. Kanojia was nominated in the Best Philanthropic Streamer category of the 2021 The Streamer Awards.

Kanojia has claimed that these livestreamed conversations are not psychotherapy sessions, and includes disclaimers to this effect at the start of the livestreams. Research psychologist Dr. Rachel Kowert has argued that, contrary to these disclaimers, "everything that you witness in the show is clearly therapy". Several journalists and commentators have expressed similar concerns, and suggested that Kanojia's conduct may violate ethical guidelines set by the American Psychiatric Association.

Starting in late 2019, Kanojia conducted several public interviews with online celebrity Byron Bernstein, also known by the nickname Reckful, who discussed his issues with depression, bipolar disorder and his brother's suicide during the livestream. Bernstein stated that his conversations with Kanojia made him feel better and helped him "hear my thoughts affirmed about what is important to my life". He also stated that Kanojia did not call those interviews therapy "for legal reasons," although Bernstein used the word "therapy" in the title of one of his livestreams with Kanojia. Bernstein's July 2020 suicide was addressed in one of Kanojia's livestreams shortly thereafter.

In June 2024, the Massachusetts Board of Registration in Medicine issued Kanojia with a formal reprimand in connection with these events, finding that he had "engaged in conduct that undermines the public confidence in the integrity of the medical profession." A spokesperson for the board said a reprimand is a "severe censure".

== Publications ==
- Kerr, Catherine E.; Shaw, Jessica R.; Wasserman, Rachel H.; Chen, Vanessa W.; Kanojia, Alok; Bayer, Thomas; Kelley, John M. (2008-06-01). "Tactile acuity in experienced Tai Chi practitioners: evidence for use dependent plasticity as an effect of sensory-attentional training". Experimental Brain Research. 188 (2): 317–322. doi:10.1007/s00221-008-1409-6. ISSN 1432-1106. PMC 2795804. PMID 18512052.
- Kanoja, Alok (March 12, 2024). How to Raise a Healthy Gamer: End Power Struggles, Break Bad Screen Habits, and Transform Your Relationship with Your Kids. Rodale Books. ISBN 9780593582046.
