= Stuart Levy =

Stuart Levy may refer to:

- Stuart Levy (producer) (1907–1966), British film producer
- Stuart B. Levy, microbiology researcher and physician at Tufts University
- Stuart J. Levy (born 1967), founder of the manga media company Tokyopop

== See also ==
- Stuart A. Levey, former Under Secretary for Terrorism and Financial Intelligence for the United States Department of the Treasury
