= Somerville Hospital =

CHA Somerville Campus
- Cambridge Health Alliance

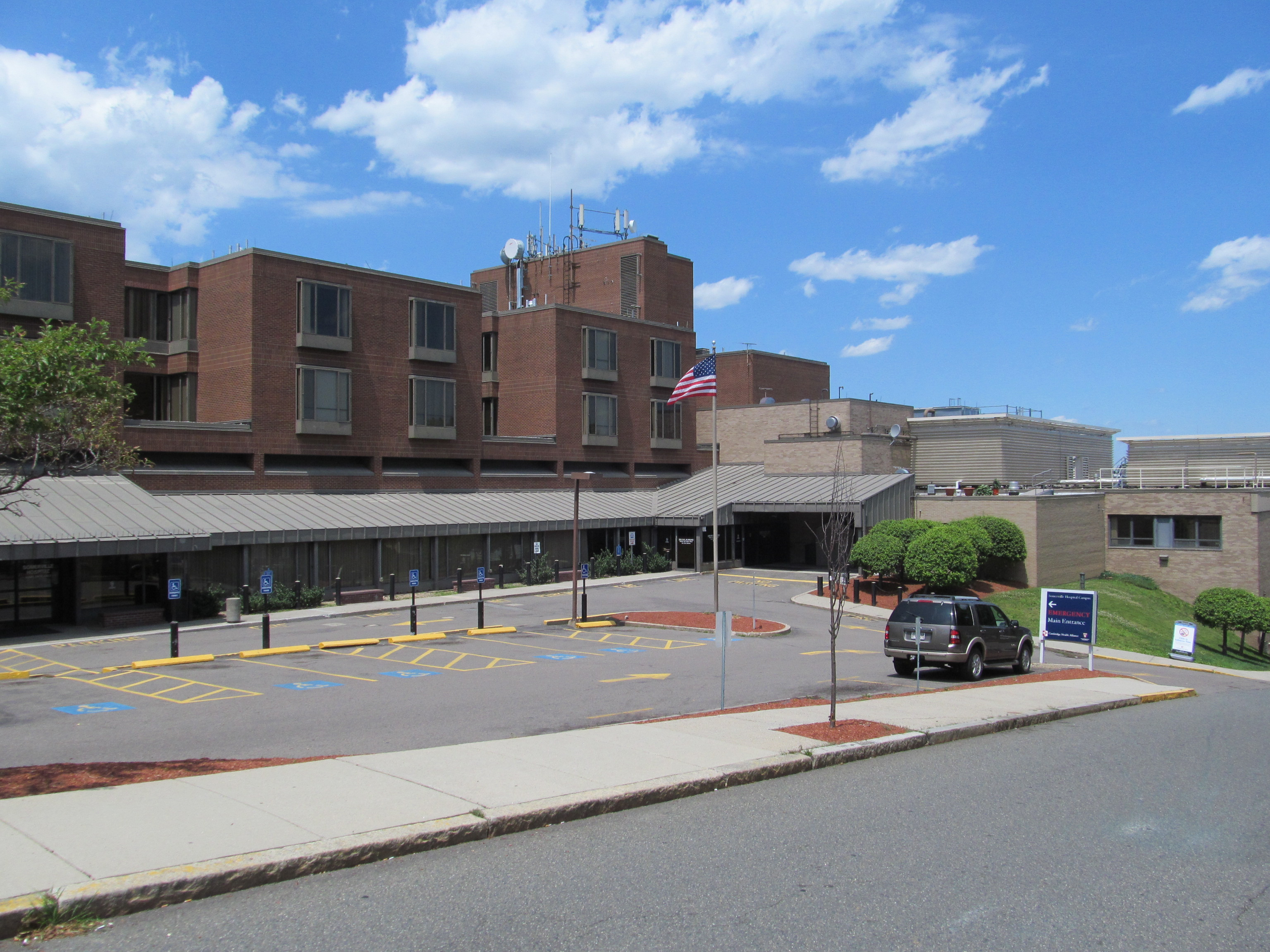
- Somerville Campus

Geography
- Location: 33 Tower Street, Somerville, Massachusetts, United States
- Coordinates: 42°23′24.0″N 71°6′33.7″W

Organization
- Type: Teaching
- Affiliated university: Harvard Medical School

History
- Founded: 1891
- Closed: Bus 88, 90; Green Line B, C, D, E

Links
- Website: www.challiance.org/locations/somerville/cha-somerville-campus
- Lists: Hospitals in Massachusetts

The CHA Somerville Campus is a medical center and inpatient psychiatric hospital at 33 Tower Street in Somerville, Massachusetts - near Porter Square and Davis Square.

It is operated by Cambridge Health Alliance.

== Services ==
The main CHA Somerville Campus has a wide variety of health services, including:

- Center of Inpatient Child & Adolescent Psychiatry
- CHA Urgent Care
- CHA Somerville Pediatrics
- Somerville OB/GYN Center
- Radiology and Imaging
- GI Center
- Eye Center
- Medical and Surgery Specialty clinics

== Service highlights ==
- Child & Adolescent Psychiatry
- Urgent Care

National Accreditation:

- CT Service, American College of Radiology
- Ultrasound Service, American College of Radiology
- Breast Imaging Center of Excellence, American College of Radiology

== Academics ==
Cambridge Health Alliance is a teaching affiliate of Harvard Medical School, Harvard School of Public Health, Harvard School of Dental Medicine, and the Tufts University School of Medicine.

== History ==
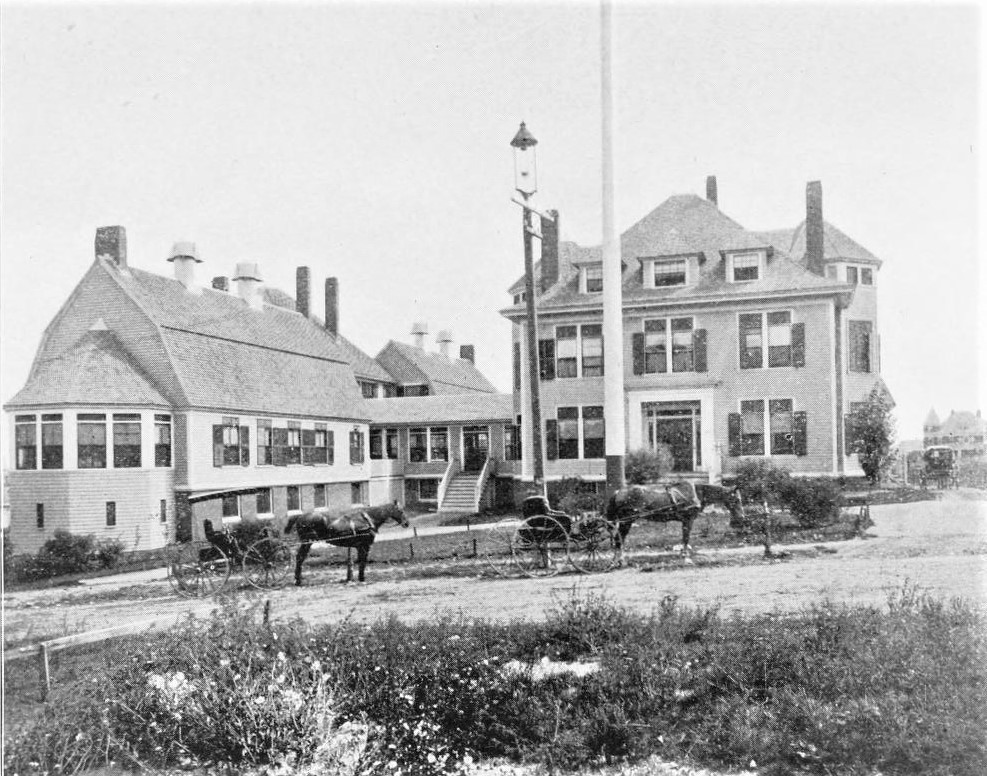

The hospital was first incorporated in 1891, and the first buildings were erected the following year. In 2009, the inpatient hospital beds were closed, but the emergency department remained open as a satellite emergency facility. In April 2020, the emergency department was converted to an Urgent Care Center.

In 2022, Cambridge Health Alliance completed major renovations to the building to create a new Center for Child and Adolescent Psychiatry. This includes designated units for Children (3-13), Adolescents, and a special neuropsychiatry unit for youth with autism spectrum disorders. The campus has 69 beds, making it the largest facility for child and adolescent psychiatry in the state of Massachusetts.
