= Wael Al-Husami =

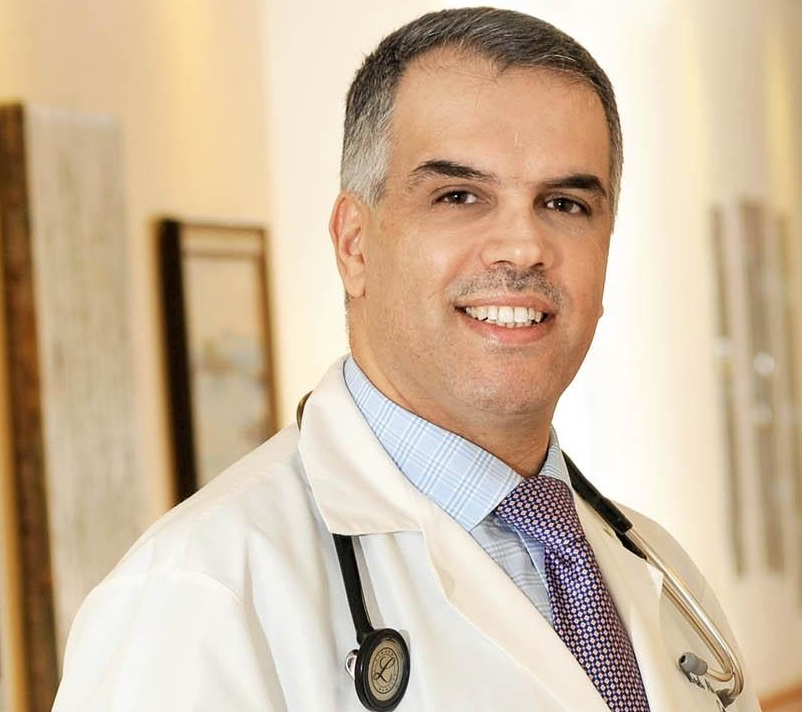
- Wael Al-Husami
- Born: Wael Fahed Al-Husami; Amman, Jordan
- Education: University of Jordan; Cornell University; Lahey Clinic
- Occupation: Interventional cardiologist
- Known for: SAMS
- Medical career
- Profession: Interventional Cardiology
- Field: Cardiology
- Institutions: Tufts University
- Research: Interventional Cardiology; Vascular Medicine; Varicose Veins

Wael Fahed Al-Husami is a Jordanian cardiologist and interventional cardiologist, scientist and medical educator at Tufts University and a faculty member at Brown University's Alpert Medical School, and a faculty Member at BIDMC Disaster Medicine Fellowship - Harvard Medical School. Al-Husami is also a visiting professor of Medicine at the Royal College of Surgeons in Ireland.

== Early life and education ==
Al-Husami received his bachelor's degree in Medicine and Surgery from the University of Jordan in 1996. Afterwards, he worked as a physician at Al-Basheer Hospital in Amman then completed his residency in internal medicine at Weill Cornell Medicine and completed fellowships in cardiovascular disease, interventional cardiology, vascular medicine and endovascular peripheral intervention at Lahey Hospital & Medical Center and St. Elizabeth's Medical Center in Boston, Massachusetts through the Tufts University School of Medicine.

== Career ==
Al-Husami is an interventional cardiologist, Medical Director of International Health and a senior member of the executive health team of Lahey Hospital & Medical Center, a nonprofit, physician-led academic medical center in Burlington, Massachusetts.

Dr. Al-Husami has experience in healthcare leadership, international health and business development.

He served as a Senior Medical Quality Expert in the customer protection unit for the Dubai Health Authority, the governing body and regulator of Dubai Healthcare City. Al-Husami's clinical leadership roles include having served as Medical Director for Hospital Medicine for the Prima CARE-Steward Health Care Network, Cardiac Cath Lab Director at Steward HFH hospital, as well as a Senior Physician Expert and Medical Director for Executive Health Resources.

He established a clinical nursing program at Lahey Hospital & Medical Center in partnership with multiple universities in Massachusetts and the Middle East, and serves as a board member of New England chapter The Syrian American Medical Society and member of the cardiology committee of SAMS, a global medical relief non-profit organization based in Washington DC.

He has conducted a plethora of research in cardiovascular disease, and his work has been published in a variety of medical journals including Journal of Invasive Cardiology, American College of Cardiology, Endovascular Today, Journal of Thoracic Disease and American College of Physicians

== Selected publications ==
Al-Husami's have several important publications in his field include:

- " Single-center experience with the TandemHeart percutaneous ventricular assist device to support patients undergoing high-risk percutaneous coronary intervention", Journal of Invasive Cardiology (2008)
- " Percutaneous repair of a pseudoaneurysm associated with coarctation of the aorta", Journal of Invasive Cardiology (2008)
- " Qualitative coronary artery calcium assessment on CT lung screening exam helps predict first cardiac events", Journal of Thoracic Disease (2017)
- " Angiotensin II Administration in Patients with COVID-19 Shock", Critical Pathways in Cardiology (2020)
