= Tambra Raye Stevenson =

American entrepreneur

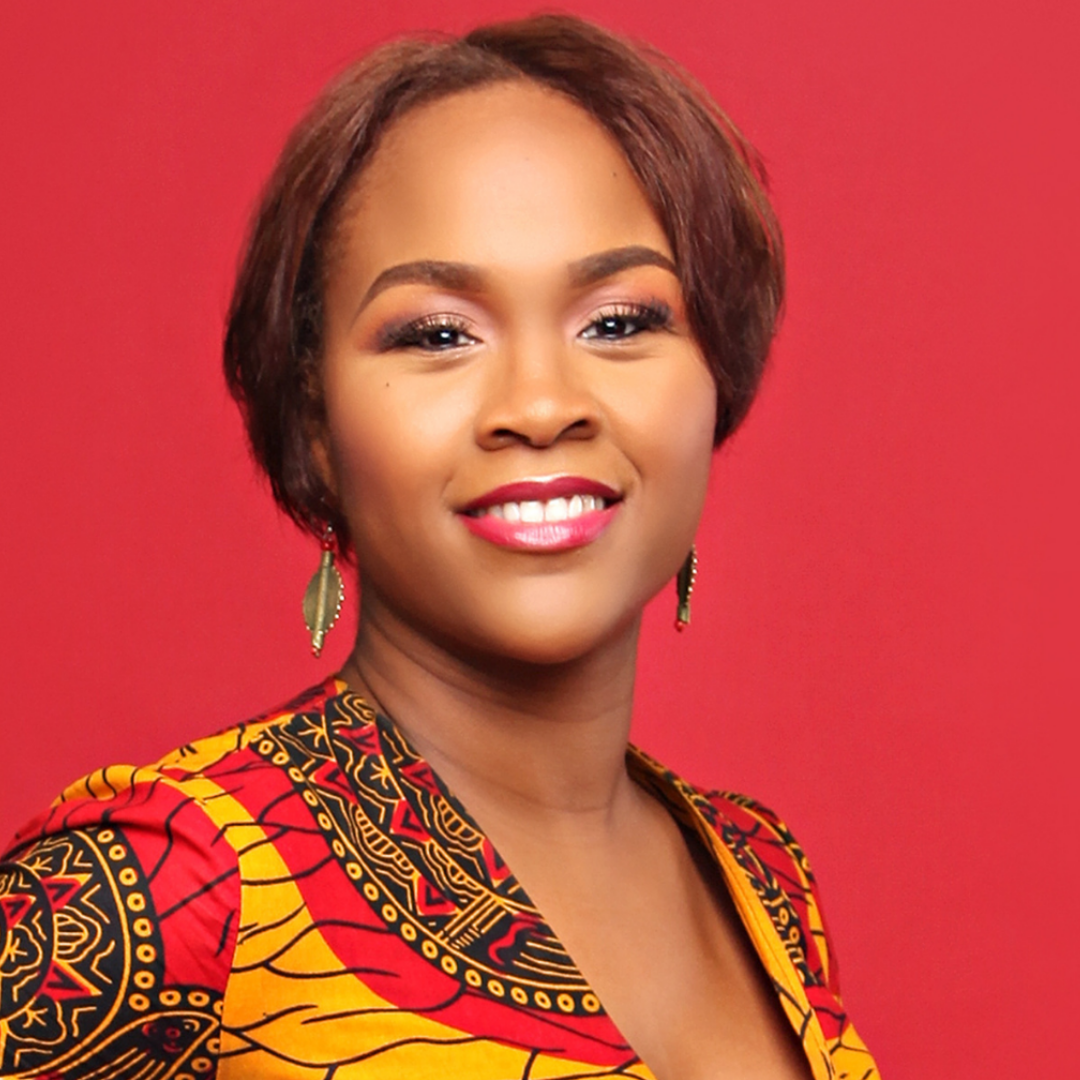
- Stevenson in 2021
- Born: Oklahoma City, Oklahoma, U.S.
- Education: Carl Albert High School
- Alma mater: Oklahoma State University (BS); Tufts University School of Medicine (MPH)
- Occupations: Nutritionist, public speaker, policy advisor, food justice activist
- Known for: Founder/CEO of WANDA and NativSol Kitchen

Tambra Raye Stevenson is an African-American entrepreneur, nutrition educator, public speaker, policy advisor, inventor, and food justice activist. Stevenson founded WANDA (Women, Advancing, Dietetics and Nutrition) and NativSol Kitchen. She is a Nutrition and Health Co-chair for the DC Food Policy Council, a Committee member for the National Agricultural Research, Extension, Education, and Economics (NAREEE) Advisory Board, and was named National Geographic Traveler of the Year in 2014. She is co-chair of Bringing It To The Table.

== Early life ==
Stevenson was raised in a multi-faith family.

Stevenson earned a BS degree in nutritional science and minored in Spanish at Oklahoma State University in 2002. During that same year, she completed a Study Abroad Program in Community Health and Spanish Immersion at Pontificia Universidad Católica Madre y Maestra, Santiago, Dominican Republic as a Boren National Security Scholar.

In 2004, she continued her education at Tufts University School of Medicine in Boston, Massachusetts achieving an MPH in health communications. Stevenson, through the University of the District of Columbia, Washington D.C., began a Didactic Program in Dietetics in 2012, and completed a Dietetic Internship in 2014.

Currently, she is completing a Ph.D. program at American University School of Communication in Washington, DC.

She is known for challenging Westernized diets that cause negative outcomes for women and girls of the African diaspora. Through nutritional education, advocacy, government partnerships and cultural awareness, she focuses on building healthy, sustainable communities, foods, self care, and support for improved health outcomes.

She was named a Change Maker, by Clean Eating magazine, and 2021 UCS Science Defender, by the Union of Concerned Scientists.

== Career ==
She began a career in public service at the Minority Business Development Agency, US Department of Commerce; including the first Washington, D.C. Mayor's Office on Women's Policy and Initiatives.

In 2016, she organized “Black Women Getting in Formation."

In 2020, she organized WANDA Academy. She is the author of a series of bilingual children's books on nutrition called Where's WANDA? which are illustrated by Nigerian artists.

USDA Secretary Tom Vilsack selected Stevenson to serve on the National Agricultural Research, Extension, Education, and Economics (NAREEE) Advisory Board, 2021. In 2022, she advocated for and authored a "Food Bill of Rights". In 2023 she appeared at the National Food Policy Conference .

She is representative to the African Nutrition Society.

== Works ==
- "Black Health Bill of Rights" (PDF). Council on Black Health. 2021.

== Honors and recognition ==
- Dr. Wm. Montague Cobb Food and Health Advocacy Award, N.A.A.C.P., 2017.
- Diversity Hall of Fame/Rising Star Recipient, Oklahoma State University, 2016.
- Nutrition Hero, Food and Nutrition Magazine, 2014.
- Traveler of the Year, National Geographic, 2014.
- Emerging Leader in Dietetics/Cynthia A. Reeser Award, D.C. Academy of Nutrition and Dietetics, 2012.
