= Anna Quincy Churchill =

American physician

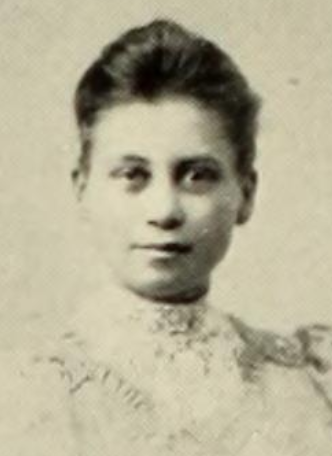
- Anna Quincy Churchill, from the 1907 yearbook of Smith College
- Born: May 31, 1884; Boston, Massachusetts
- Died: March 21, 1971 (aged 86); Boston, Massachusetts
- Occupation: Medical school professor

Anna Quincy Churchill (May 31, 1884 – March 21, 1971) was an American physician. She was on the faculty of Tufts University School of Medicine and School of Dental Medicine from 1918 to 1954.

== Early life and education ==
Churchill was born in Boston, the daughter of Joseph Richmond Churchill and Mary Cushing Churchill. Her father was a banker, botanist and judge. She was named for her grandmother, Anna Quincy Thaxter Cushing. She graduated from Smith College in 1907, earned a master's degree in biology at Radcliffe College in 1910, studied at the Boston School of Gymnastics, and completed her medical degree at Tufts University School of Medicine in 1917.

== Career ==
Churchill served an internship at the New England Hospital for Women and Children in 1916. She was on the faculty of Tufts University School of Medicine and School of Dental Medicine from 1918 to 1954, and was one of the first if not the first woman to have served on the faculty of a medical school. She was assistant professor of microscopic anatomy in 1926, when she published an article about dental fissures. She also taught histology at the Sargent School of Physical Education in Cambridge. She was a member of the American Association for the Advancement of Science.

In 1954, Churchill established scholarships for biology undergraduate students, in memory of her parents. She also made personal loans to Tufts dental school students in need. She was awarded the Distinguished Service Key by Tufts in 1955. In retirement, she continued to attend faculty meetings at Tufts; in the late 1960s, when she was in her eighties, she was still performing autopsies.

Churchill served on a committee of the Boston Medical Library. She was active in the New England Women's Medical Society, Brookline Bird Club, the American Association of University Women, and the Animal Rescue League of Boston.

== Personal life ==
Churchill was "known for carrying a parasol on and off campus". She died in 1971, aged 87 years, in Boston.
