= CHA Everett Hospital =

Coordinates: 42°24′33.37″N 71°02′20.99″W

CHA Everrett Hospital
- Cambridge Health Alliance

Geography
- Location: 103 Garland St, Everett, Massachusetts, United States

Organization
- Type: Teaching
- Affiliated university: Tufts University School of Medicine

Services
- Emergency department: 24 Hour

Links
- Website: www.challiance.org/Locations/WhiddenHospitalCampus.aspx
- Lists: Hospitals in Massachusetts

CHA Everett Hospital (formerly CHA Whidden Hospital/ Whidden Memorial Hospital) is a 162-bed medical/surgical and psychiatric hospital in Everett, Massachusetts. It is one of three hospitals in Cambridge Health Alliance.

Located at 103 Garland Street, CHA Everett Hospital serves the 200,000 residents of Everett, Revere, Chelsea, Winthrop, and Malden, MA, as the only hospital in the five-city area.

== Services ==
Cambridge Health Alliance has made many changes at CHA Everett Hospital. This includes a 64-slice CT Scanner, open MRI, Digital Mammography services, and an Emergency Department.

CHA Everett Hospital campus has a wide variety of health services including:

- 24-hour Emergency Department
- Radiology and Imaging
- Medical Specialties
- Surgical Specialties
- Rehabilitation
- Pulmonary Rehab

== Service Highlights ==
Community Hospital Cancer Program, Am. College of Surgeons Commission on Cancer
Primary Stroke Service, MA Department of Public Health

== Academics ==
CHA Everett Hospital is a teaching site for the Tufts University School of Medicine. Cambridge Health Alliance is also a teaching affiliate of Harvard Medical School, Harvard School of Public Health, Harvard School of Dental Medicine.

== Further Information ==
- WCVB - Channel 5 Boston, "Harvard Program Focuses On Bedside Manner", WCVB, September 27, 2011
- Bielaszka-DuVernay, Christina, "Taking Public Health Approaches To Care In Massachusetts", Health Affairs, September 2011
- Conaboy, Chelsea, "Connecting underserved patients to preventive care", Boston.com, May 23, 2011
- Nesin, Marjorie, "Cambridge Health wins Harvard Medical School Diversity Award", Boston.com, May 6, 2011
- Shaw, Gienna, "Case Study: The Coordinated ED", Health Leaders Media Breakthroughs, April 29, 2011
- AAMC, "The Academic Researcher: Bringing Science to Health Care Delivery", Association of American Medical Colleges, April 20, 2011
- Daniel, Seth, "Practicing Teamwork – Revere Clinic is All About Collaboration and Communication", Revere Journal, March 3, 2011
- Parker, Brock, "Check online for hospital emergency room wait times", Boston.com, February 18, 2011
- Laidler, John, "Health care focusing on teamwork", Boston.com, December 16, 2010
- Falco, Miriam, "Study: Lack of breastfeeding costs lives, billions of dollars", CNN.com, April 6, 2010
- Fennimore, Jillian, "Federal funds help heal ailing Cambridge Health Alliance", Cambridge Chronicle, March 25, 2009
