= Josefa Zaratt =

Puerto Rican black female physician

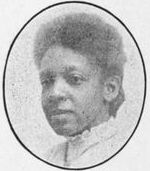
- Dr. Zaratt in staff portrait of Douglass Hospital
- Born: March 19, 1871; San Juan, Puerto Rico
- Died: August 4, 1962 (aged 91); Bronx, New York, USA
- Education: Tufts University School of Medicine (MD)
- Occupation: Doctor

Josefa Zaratt (also Zarratt) (March 19, 1871 – August 4, 1962) was the first Black woman to graduate from Tufts Medical School. She was one of the earliest Black women physicians in the United States.

== Life ==
Zaratt was born in 1871 in San Juan, Puerto Rico.

Zaratt studied at Tufts University School of Medicine, graduating in 1905. She then returned to Puerto Rico, but was denied a license to practice medicine there. She returned to the continental United States and passed the examination of the State Board of Registration in Medicine in Massachusetts.

She worked at Douglass Hospital in Philadelphia, Pennsylvania in 1910. By 1923 she was practicing medicine in Springfield, Massachusetts and in 1932 she lived in Boston, Massachusetts.

Zaratt died on August 4, 1962, at Fordham Hospital in the Bronx, New York. aged 91. She was buried at Ferncliff Cemetery and Mausoleum in Greenburgh, New York.
