= Maryn McKenna =

American journalist and author

- Occupations: author, journalist
- Years active: since 1985
- Notable work: Superbug: The Fatal Menace of MRSA; Beating Back the Devil

Maryn McKenna is an American author and journalist. She has written for Nature, National Geographic, and Scientific American, and spoke on antibiotics at TED 2015.

== Career ==
In 2009, McKenna received a Dart Center Ochberg Fellowship from The Journalism School at Columbia University. In 2012, she was awarded an Ethics & Justice Investigative Journalism Fellowship at The Schuster Institute for Investigative Journalism at Brandeis University. In 2013, she joined the Knight Science Journalism program at the Massachusetts Institute of Technology to work on a Fellowship.

McKenna has written for Nature, Scientific American, Wired and the National Geographic, and has been a staff reporter for The Cincinnati Enquirer, the Boston Herald and The Atlanta Journal-Constitution.

Her book Beating Back the Devil: On the Front Lines with the Disease Detectives of the Epidemic Intelligence Service is about the Epidemic Intelligence Service of the Centers for Disease Control and Prevention. Her book Superbug: The Fatal Menace of MRSA is about methicillin-resistant Staphylococcus aureus; a review on the CDC website called it "an extensively researched and detailed review".

Her article "Imagining the Post-Antibiotics Future" is included in The Best American Science and Nature Writing 2014.

== Selected works ==
- Beating Back the Devil: On the Front Lines with the Disease Detectives of the Epidemic Intelligence Service (2004)
- Superbug: The Fatal Menace of MRSA (2010)
- Big Chicken: The Incredible Story of How Antibotics Created Modern Agriculture and Changed the Way the World Eats (2017)
- "Return of the germs". Scientific American. 323 (3): 48–54. September 2020.

== Awards and honors ==
McKenna received a Byron H. Waksman Award for Excellence in the Public Communication of Life Sciences in 2013, and a Leadership Award from the Alliance for the Prudent Use of Antibiotics in 2014.
