= Alliance for the Prudent Use of Antibiotics =

American non-profit organization

The Alliance for the Prudent Use of Antibiotics (APUA) is a non-profit organization founded in 1981 by Stuart B. Levy (1938–2019), Professor of Medicine at Tufts University and headquartered in Boston, Massachusetts. APUA's mission is to strengthen society's defenses against infectious disease by promoting appropriate access and use to antimicrobial agents (antibiotics, antivirals, antimalarials etc.) and controlling antimicrobial resistance on a worldwide basis. APUA has a network of affiliated chapters in over 50 countries, and conducts applied antimicrobial resistance research, education, capacity building and advocacy at the global and grassroots levels.

Wide-scale misuse of antibiotics and other antimicrobials and related resistance to these drugs is challenging infectious disease treatment and health care budgets worldwide. Antimicrobials are uniquely societal drugs because each individual patient use can propagate resistant organisms. APUA provides information to individuals, doctors and policy makers aimed at preserving the power of these agents by preventing infection, reducing drug resistance and increasing the effectiveness of treatment for infectious diseases, including acute bacterial diseases, tuberculosis, AIDS and malaria.

Following Stuart Levy's retirement in 2018, APUA merged with the International Society of Antimicrobial Chemotherapy (ISAC), effective from February 2019. ISAC was founded as a charity in 1961 and, in response to the dynamic nature of the subject matter, has focused most recently on antimicrobial stewardship and antimicrobial resistance.

== APUA Leadership Award ==
Each year, APUA presents its Leadership Award in recognition of outstanding global contributions and commitment to preserve the power of antibiotics.

=== Past recipients ===
- 2015 Kevin Outterson
- 2014 Maryn McKenna and John LaMattina
- 2013 Keith Klugman and Moises Morejon-Garcia
- 2012 Roman S. Kozlov M.D. and APUA-Russia
- 2011 Giuseppe Cornaglia, M.D. of the European Society of Clinical Microbiology and Infectious Diseases
- 2010 Otto Cars, M.D., chairman of ReAct – Action on Antibiotic Resistance, based in Uppsala, Sweden
- 2009 Infectious Diseases Society of America
- 2008 Dutch Working Party on Antibiotic Policy (SWAB) and Dutch Working Party on Infection Prevention (WIP)
- 2007 International Centre for Diarrhoeal Disease Research, Bangladesh (ICDDR,B),
- 2006 Herman Goossens and Anna Lönnroth, European Commission
- 2005 Dr. Richard Besser – the U.S. Centers for Disease Control and Prevention
- 2004 Dr. Gabriel Schmunis – the Pan American Health Organization
- 2003
  - Robert L. Langer – McDonald's
  - Drs. Frank M. Aarestrup and Henrik C. Wegener – Danish Veterinary Institute
- 2002
  - Dr. Murray Lumpkin – U.S. Food and Drug Administration
  - Dr. David Bell – U.S. Centers for Disease Control and Prevention
  - Dr. Marissa Miller – National Institute of Allergy and Infectious Diseases
- 2001 Dr. Rosamund Williams – World Health Organization
