= Helen Boucher =

American physician

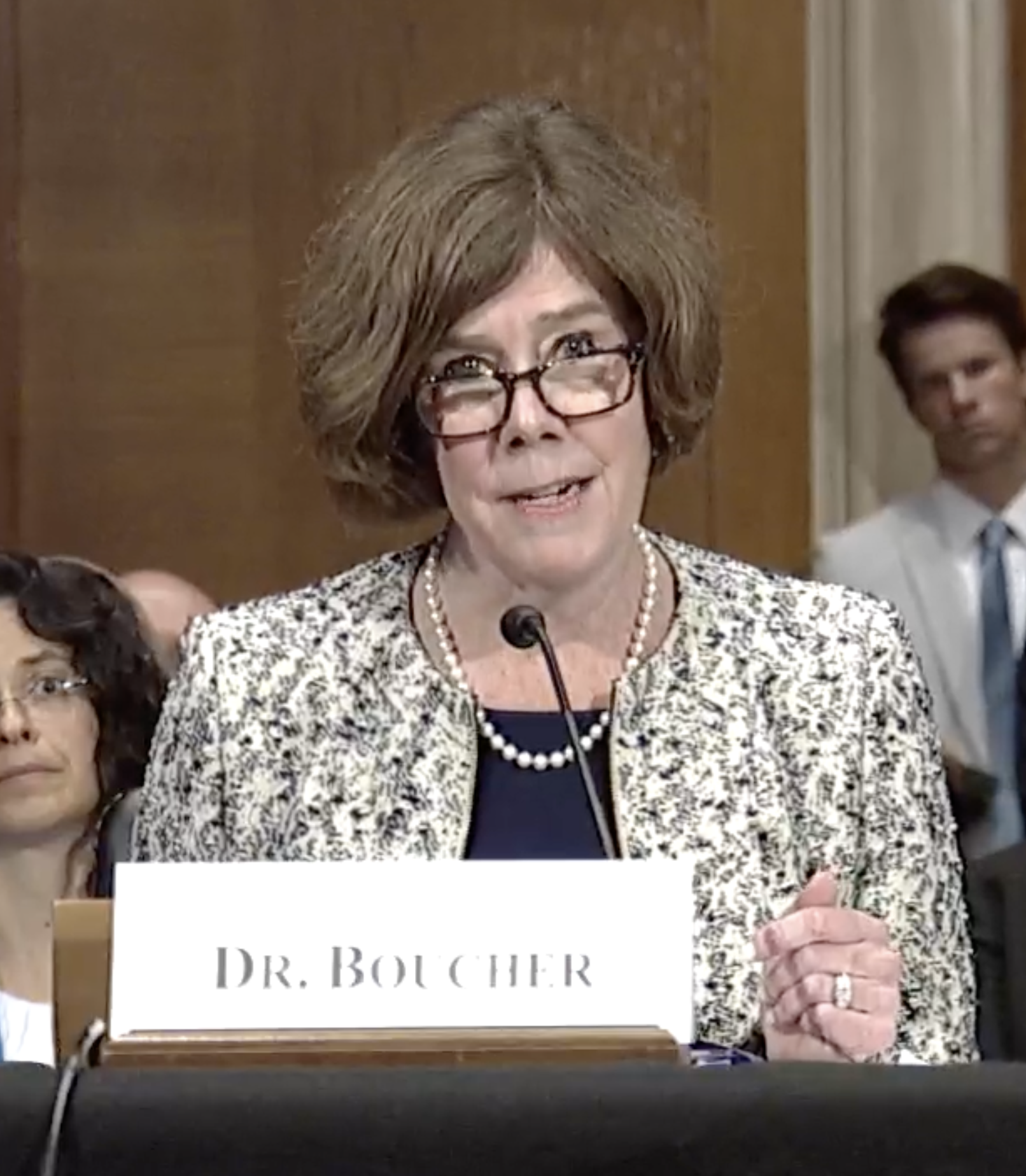
- Boucher in 2023

Dean of the Tufts University School of Medicine
- Incumbent
- Assumed office July 1, 2022
- President: Anthony Monaco; Sunil Kumar
- Preceded by: Harris Berman

Personal details
- Born: 1964 (age 61–62)
- Education: College of the Holy Cross (BA); University of Texas (MD)
- Occupation: Physician; researcher; infectious disease expert

Helen Whamond Boucher (born 1964) is an American physician and infectiologist who has been the dean of the Tufts University School of Medicine since 2022. She is also the Chief Academic Officer of Tufts Medicine, the parent health system for the Tufts Medical Center in Boston. She is the first woman to serve as dean.

Boucher previously served as chief of the Division of Geographic Medicine and Infectious Diseases at Tufts Medical Center, a professor of medicine at the Tufts University School of Medicine, and the director of the Stuart B. Levy Center for Integrated Management of Antimicrobial Resistance at Tufts.

== Early life and education ==
Boucher was raised in Connecticut as the oldest of five children. She graduated from the College of the Holy Cross with a Bachelor of Arts in English literature in 1986 and earned her Doctor of Medicine (M.D.) in 1993 from the McGovern Medical School (formerly the University of Texas Medical School at Houston) at the Texas Medical Center.

Boucher completed her internship, residency, and chief residency in internal medicine at New England Deaconess Hospital. She was a resident there from 1993 to 1997 and was the hospital's chief resident in 1996–1997. She then completed a clinical and research fellowship at Beth Israel Deaconess Medical Center, remaining there until 2000.

== Career ==
After completing her fellowship, Boucher became an infectious-diseases physician at Tufts Medical Center in 2002 in its Division of Geographic Medicine and Infectious Diseases. She then became a professor of medicine at the Tufts University School of Medicine. In 2005, she became director of Tufts Medical Center's Infectious Diseases Fellowship Program. In 2015, she became director of Tufts Medical Center's Heart Transplant and Ventricular Assist Device Infectious Diseases Program.

In 2018, Boucher became the inaugural director of the Tufts Center for Integrated Management of Antimicrobial Resistance, a joint initiative of Tufts University and Tufts Medical Center focusing on antimicrobial resistance research. The center was later renamed the Stuart B. Levy Center for Integrated Management of Antimicrobial Resistance. In 2015, Boucher was appointed a member of the Presidential Advisory Council on Combating Antibiotic-Resistant Bacteria and was elected treasurer of the Infectious Diseases Society of America (IDSA).

In October 2019, Tufts Medical Center named her chief of its Division of Geographic Medicine and Infectious Diseases, succeeding David Snydman. In June 2021, Tufts University announced that Boucher would become interim dean of the Tufts University School of Medicine and chief academic officer of Wellforce, beginning July 1, 2021.

As a scholar, Boucher's research focuses on drug-resistant medical infections. She has also commented on public medical issues in publications including the Washington Post. She is an associate editor of Infectious Diseases and a member of the editorial board for Antimicrobial Agents and Chemotherapy.

=== Dean of Tufts Medicine (2022–present) ===
In October 2022, after serving for more than a year as interim dean, Boucher was named the dean of the Tufts University School of Medicine while also being the chief academic officer of Tufts Medicine. She became the first woman to lead the medical school in its 129-year history.

== Personal life ==
Boucher is married to Norm Boucher, whom she met while they were both undergraduates at the College of the Holy Cross. They have two daughters.
