= Joseph Barnett Kirsner =

American gastroenterologist

- Born: September 21, 1909; Boston, Massachusetts, U.S.
- Died: July 7, 2012 (aged 102); Chicago, Illinois, U.S.
- Education: Tufts University School of Medicine, Woodlawn Hospital, University of Chicago
- Spouse: Minnie Schneider

Joseph Barnett Kirsner (September 21, 1909 – July 7, 2012) was an American gastroenterologist and Louis Block Distinguished Service Professor of medicine at the University of Chicago. He was a pioneer in the field of digestive system disorders and was the first person to show the increased risk of colon cancer in patients with ulcerative colitis.

== Early life ==
Kirsner was born on September 21, 1909, in a Jewish family. He was the eldest of five children. In 1933, Kirsner moved to Chicago after graduating from the Tufts University School of Medicine. Kirsner married Minnie Schneider, whom he met at Woodlawn Hospital on Chicago's South Side. While at University of Chicago, he published 750 papers and wrote six editions of a textbook on inflammatory bowel disease. In 1935, he joined the University of Chicago faculty and continued to see patients till the age of 100.

He had been instrumental in founding the American Gastroenterological Association, the American Society for Gastrointestinal Endoscopy and the American Association for the Study of Liver Diseases.

== Awards and recognition ==
Over the course of his career, he was awarded twice with a lifetime achievement award by the Crohn's & Colitis Foundation of America. He also received the Distinguished Educator Award from the American Gastroenterological Association (AGA).

== Publications ==
- Inflammatory Bowel Disease, Saunders, October 6, 1999, English, ISBN 978-0-72167-6166
- Origins and Directions of Inflammatory Bowel Disease, Springer, 13 November 2013, English, ISBN 978-9-4010-3874-4
- Pocket Handbook of Inflammatory Bowel Disease, Heinle, 21 January 2004, English, ISBN 978-1-4130-0679-7
- Inflammatory Bowel Disease: A Guide for Patients and Their Families, Lippincott Williams and Wilkins, 1 February 1985, English, ISBN 978-0890049501
- The Development of American Gastroenterology, Lippincott Williams and Wilkins, 1 April 1990, English, ISBN 978-0881676037
- Crohn's Disease of the Gastrointestinal Tract, John Wiley & Sons Inc, 1 September 1980, English, ISBN 978-0471488965
- Diseases of the Colon, Rectum and Anal Canal, Lippincott Williams and Wilkins, 1 April 1988, English, ISBN 978-0683046236
- Growth of Gastroenterologic Knowledge During the 20th Century, Lea & Febiger, U.S., 1 April 1994, English, ISBN 978-0812115925
- The Early Days of American Gastroenterology, Lippincott Williams and Wilkins, 1 October 1998, English, ISBN 978-0397587315

== Death ==
In 2012, Kirsner died of kidney failure in Chicago. He was 102 years old.
