= John S. Kauer =

Professor emeritus at Tufts University School of Medicine

John S. Kauer is a professor emeritus at the Tufts University School of Medicine. He is known for his pioneering work on the anatomy and physiology of the vertebrate olfactory system, in particular of the tiger salamander (Ambystoma tigrinum). His early experiments pioneered methods for carefully controlling olfactory stimuli to study odor coding in the olfactory bulb, and using digital imaging to monitor neuronal activity.

The work of his laboratory advanced the view that odors are encoded in a parallel distributed fashion in the peripheral olfactory system, a concept that was ultimately accepted and is now referred to as "combinatorial" coding. Using principles learned from biological olfactory systems, he later developed a device to locate land mines by detecting the odor of 2,4-Dinitrotoluene (DNT), a precursor to trinitrotoluene (TNT).
