= Stuart B. Levy =

American microbiologist, expert on antibiotic resistance

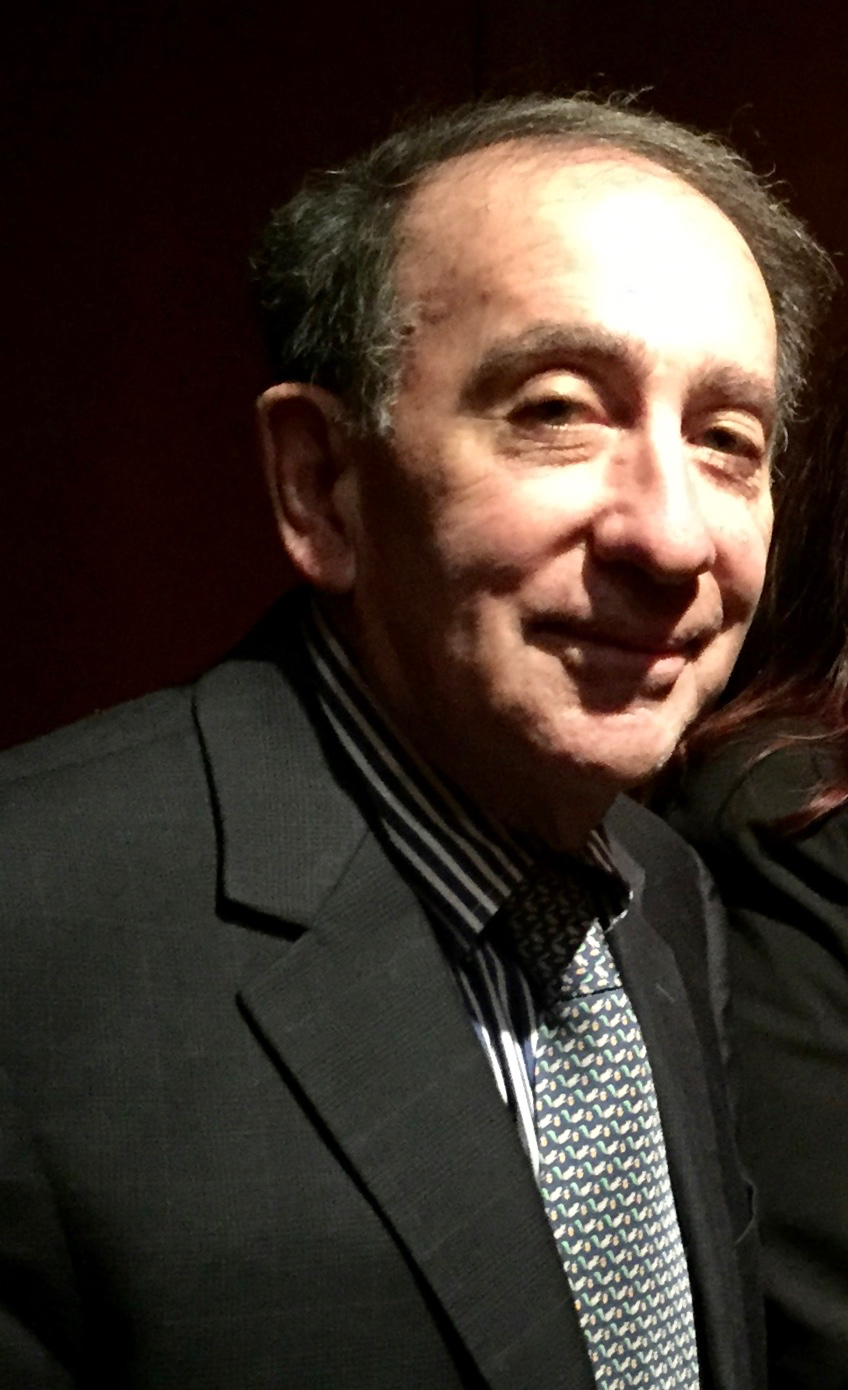
- Born: Stuart Blank Levy; November 21, 1938; Wilmington, Delaware, U.S.
- Died: September 4, 2019 (aged 80); Boston, Massachusetts, U.S.
- Education: Williams College; University of Pennsylvania
- Occupation: Microbiologist
- Employer: Tufts University School of Medicine
- Spouse: Cecile Pastel (m. 1983)
- Children: 3

Stuart Blank Levy (November 21, 1938 – September 4, 2019) was a researcher and physician at Tufts University. He was among the first to advocate for greater awareness of antibiotic resistance and founded the Alliance for the Prudent Use of Antibiotics.

== Biography ==
Stuart B. Levy, M.D., Professor of Molecular Biology and Microbiology and of Medicine, was the Director of the Center for Adaptation Genetics and Drug Resistance at Tufts University School of Medicine and staff physician at the Tufts Medical Center. He also served as President of the International Alliance for the Prudent Use of Antibiotics, and along with Walter Gilbert, co-founded Paratek Pharmaceuticals. He was a past President of the American Society for Microbiology. Professor Levy died on September 4, 2019, and in 2020, the Tufts Center for Integrated Management of Antimicrobial Resistance was renamed in his honor.

Dr. Levy led the discovery of the first energy-dependent antibiotic efflux mechanism and efflux protein (for tetracyclines). His research into multiple drug resistance revealed a regulatory locus, mar, for intrinsic antibiotic resistance and virulence among the Enterobacteriaceae and other bacteria. He led the first, and perhaps only, prospective farm study showing that feed containing low dose antibiotics led to the emergence of antibiotic resistance in animals and the farm family. He has published over 300 papers, edited four books and two special journal editions devoted to antibiotic use and resistance. His 1992 book, The Antibiotic Paradox: How Miracle Drugs Are Destroying the Miracle, now in its second edition, has been translated into four languages.

Dr. Levy received his bachelor's degree from Williams College, magna cum laude, and his medical degree from the Perelman School of Medicine at the University of Pennsylvania, during which time he spent a year in radiation genetics at the Institut de Radium of the Pasteur Institute in Paris. He completed his residency at Mt. Sinai Hospital in New York and performed postdoctoral research at the National Institutes of Health. He is a Fellow of the American College of Physicians, Infectious Disease Society of America, the American Academy of Microbiology and the American Association for the Advancement of Science. He was Chairperson of the U.S. Fogarty Center study of “Antibiotic use and resistance worldwide” and helped write the U.S. Office of Technology Assessment report on antibiotic resistant bacteria. He consults for international and national organizations including the World Health Organization, the U.S. National Academy of Sciences and Institute of Medicine, the U.S. FDA and U.S. EPA. In 1995 he received the Hoechst Roussel Award for esteemed research in antimicrobial chemotherapy from the American Society for Microbiology and has been awarded honorary degrees from Wesleyan and Des Moines Universities. Dr. Levy received the 2011 Hamao Umezawa Memorial Award by the International Society of Chemotherapy and the 2012 Abbott-ASM Lifetime Achievement Award.

== Views ==
Levy has summarized his message by saying that he wants "prudent use of antibiotics".

The book Frontiers in antimicrobial resistance : a tribute to Stuart B. Levy is based on the work of Levy.

== Bibliography ==
- Levy, S. B. (2001). "Antibiotic Resistance: Consequences of Inaction". Clinical Infectious Diseases. 33: S124–S129. doi:10.1086/321837. PMID 11524708.
- Levy, Stuart B. (2002). The Antibiotic Paradox : How The Misuse of Antibiotics Destroys Their Curative Powers (2.ed., [reprint] ed.). Cambridge, Massachusetts: Perseus Publ. ISBN 978-0738204406.
  - Reviews include the following:
  - Kunin, C. M. (1993). "Book Review the Antibiotic Paradox: How Miracle Drugs Are Destroying the Miracle by Stuart B. Levy. 279 pp., illustrated. New York, Plenum, 1992. $24.95. 0-306-44331-7". New England Journal of Medicine. 328 (24): 1792. doi:10.1056/NEJM199306173282418.
  - Polly, S. M. (1993). "The Antibiotic Paradox: How Miracle Drugs Are Destroying the Miracle". JAMA: The Journal of the American Medical Association. 270 (3): 384. doi:10.1001/jama.1993.03510030108048.
  - Sheehan, G. J. (1993). "Reviews and Notes: Infectious Disease Medicine: The Antibiotic Paradox: How Miracle Drugs Are Destroying the Miracle". Annals of Internal Medicine. 119 (5): 447. doi:10.7326/0003-4819-119-5-199309010-00057. S2CID 53088922.
