= Center for Integrated Management of Antimicrobial Resistance =

US research center

The Stuart B. Levy Center for Integrated Management of Antimicrobial Resistance is a center for research and education focusing on pathogens that exhibit antimicrobial resistance located at Tufts University and Tufts Medical Center.

== History ==
Tufts University and the Tufts Medical Center founded the Center for Integrated Management of Antimicrobial Resistance (CIMAR) in 2018. The CIMAR was established in order to provide a response to "superbug" epidemics. The founding co-directors of the center were Helen Boucher and Ralph Isberg. The center was renamed in honor of Stuart B. Levy in 2020. Researchers associated with the Levy CIMAR include Maya Nadimpalli.
