= Cambridge Health Alliance =

Coordinates: 42.3748°N 71.1048°W

Geography
- Location: Cambridge, Massachusetts, United States

Organization
- Care system: Public
- Type: Academic Teaching, Community
- Affiliated university: Harvard Medical School, Tufts School of Medicine

Services
- Emergency department: 24-hour emergency care at two locations

History
- Founded: Cambridge City Hospital -> Cambridge Hospital, Somerville Hospital; Merged 1996; Whidden Memorial Hospital; Merged 2001

Links
- Website: http://www.challiance.org
- Lists: Hospitals in the United States

Cambridge Health Alliance (CHA) is a healthcare provider in Cambridge, Somerville and Boston's metro-north communities in Massachusetts. CHA offers services including primary care, specialty care, and mental health/substance use services. It includes two acute care hospitals, primary care and specialty practice facilities, and the Cambridge Public Health Department. CHA maintains an affiliation with Beth Israel Deaconess Medical Center in Boston and is a Tufts University School of Medicine and Harvard Medical School teaching affiliate.

== Locations ==
CHA includes two acute care hospitals, primary care and specialty practices, and the Cambridge Public Health Department. The two CHA hospitals are Cambridge Hospital and Everett Hospital.

In addition to the two hospitals, CHA has locations in Cambridge, Somerville, Malden, Revere, and Everett.

== History ==
In 1911, the City of Cambridge passed the City Council Act of 1911 which authorized the establishment of a new hospital to serve the "medically indigent in the community." Four years later, the Cambridge City Hospital building was designed by Edward Thomas Patrick Graham. In 1918 the hospital building itself was completed, located at 1493 Cambridge Street Mid-Cambridge/Inman Square. Early records indicate that the hospital was deeply involved with medical philanthropy; in 1921 it had a nearly three to one cost to revenue ratio.

In regards to labor and delivery, Cambridge City Hospital was quite active, shown in the "Births" section of the Cambridge chronicle, a now defunct portion of the newspaper listing Cambridge city births. An August 1927 "Births" Cambridge Chronicle listed over half of the monthly births as taking place at the Cambridge City Hospital, with the second most popular location for births being private homes. Furthermore, according to the Cambridge Chronicle in the same year, "more than 500 maternity cases applied for admission to the Cambridge Hospital in 1926" but Cambridge City Hospital was unable to accept all of the cases due to congestion within the hospital. The newspaper then estimated that more than 1200 cases would have applied for admission, if it were not for the general perception of the competitiveness of receiving a spot at the hospital, and noted that all maternity spots were reserved for the next six months.

On 16 April 1961, NBC aired "White Paper #5: An Anatomy of a Hospital" which showcased the overcrowding, understaffing, and resource allocation issues at the Cambridge City Hospital. The film raised significant awareness about the costs of medical care and spotlighted the hospital in a new national light amidst the developing Civil Rights Movement and Great Society era of United States politics.

In 1966 a new partnership was forged between the city of Cambridge, Cambridge City Hospital and Harvard University, in which the hospital became a Harvard Medical School affiliate. The partnership was aimed both at rectifying the low quality of care and management issues at the hospital, as well as advancing scientific and medical knowledge, which gave the hospital a targeted academic and pedagogical mission. Two years later the hospital opened a new building, symbolizing its newfound culture of academia and increased prestige. The Mayor of Cambridge, Walter Sullivan, emphasized the hospital’s importance to Cambridge residents from all economic, racial, and national backgrounds.

Following its affiliation with Harvard, the Cambridge Hospital began to take on an increasingly activist role within the public health sphere as well. Following Jack Geiger’s model of community health action plans and the 1978 Alma Ata Declaration, the Hospital (and Harvard Medical School as a whole) became increasingly intellectually based in the ideas of the health human rights movement. Harvard faculty at the City Hospital co-founded Physicians for Human Rights, the Society for General Internal Medicine, the US Preventive Services Task Force, Harvard Community Health Plan, the Harvard Center for Health and Environment, and Physicians for a National Health Program.

Cambridge Health Alliance (CHA) was created in 1996 when the city-owned Cambridge Hospital merged with private, nonprofit Somerville Hospital. In 2001, Hallmark Health sold the Whidden Hospital to Cambridge Health Alliance. In 2016, the name of Whidden Hospital was changed to CHA Everett Hospital. In 2020, the emergency department at Somerville Hospital became an Urgent Care Center and the name was changed to CHA Somerville Campus. The three hospitals were originally founded around the turn of the 20th century.

In 1998, fifteen years after the establishment of the American Association of Birth Centers (AABC), CHA opened the Cambridge Birth Center on 10 Camelia Avenue as part of its CHA network of care.

In 2013 Cambridge Health Alliance became affiliated with Beth Israel Deaconess Medical Center. In 2014 its physicians joined BIDCO, the Beth Israel Deaconess Care Organization. CHA is also an affiliate of the Massachusetts General Hospital for Children.

== Community programs ==
The CEO of Cambridge Health Alliance serves as commissioner of public health for the city of Cambridge. Since the system was created in 1996, it has operated the Cambridge Public Health Department through a contract with the city.

== Cambridge birth center ==
The Cambridge Birth Center (CBC) is stand-alone obstetrics and gynecology health center located in the Mid-Cambridge neighborhood of Cambridge, Massachusetts, and is part of the CHA network. The CBC’s services include gynecology, prenatal care, and general women’s health medical treatment, and includes a care team of nurses, nurse midwives, and nurse practitioners.

The Cambridge Birth Center opened in 1998 as part of the Cambridge Health Alliance (CHA) just two years after its formation as a partnership between Cambridge Hospital and Somerville Hospital. Grounded in a patient-centered, preventative care approach to public health, the new alliance between the two hospitals quickly expanded to include a variety of new outpatient offices, primary care offices, and other health care centers in Cambridge and Somerville, as well as the surrounding Metro-North towns of Everett, Revere, and Malden.

In March of 2020, the Cambridge Birth Center stopped hosting deliveries, and CHA redirected all deliveries to the McGovern Maternity Suite at CHA Cambridge Hospital. The closure of CBC left Beverly Hospital’s North Shore Birth Center as the only operating birth center in Eastern Massachusetts, until it was closed in December 2022. This prompted significant backlash from local birth and maternal health activists, as by 2023 Massachusetts only had one operating birth center, Seven Sisters Center in Northampton.

In September 2022, Cambridge Health Alliance announced it planned to reopen the birth center, following a Cambridge City policy order giving official city support to CHA in favor of reopening the birth center. Cambridge City Council documents reveal that reopening the birth center was discussed in meetings on 3 April 2023 and 26 June 2023, and the City Council considered methods to encourage CBC reopening. Nevertheless, as of December 2023, CBC remains closed for births, though it still offers gynecology, maternity, and women’s health care visits.

== Affiliated teaching hospitals ==
Cambridge Health Alliance is a Cambridge-based hospital and healthcare network in Eastern Massachusetts affiliated with Harvard Medical School, Harvard’s T.H. Chan School of Public Health, Harvard School of Dental Medicine, and Tufts University School of Medicine.

== As an employer ==
CHA employs approximately 4,500 staff members in Cambridge, Everett, Malden, Medford, Revere, and Somerville, Massachusetts. 65% of CHA's staff are unionized. As of 2013, more than 40% of CHA staff (1,600+) live within the area of Cambridge, Chelsea, Everett, Malden, Medford, Revere, Somerville, and Winthrop.

== Populations served ==
With health centers and hospitals in Cambridge, Somerville, Everett, Malden, and Revere, CHA serves populations in these areas, as well as Boston, Winthrop, Chelsea, Medford, Arlington, Belmont, Watertown, and Brookline. CHA uses a population health management strategy to treat "entire populations to be as healthy as possible" instead of "just treating illness." CHA’s health system seeks to engage with Community Care Partners and employs a Vice President of Population health Management.

In 2012, its primary care centers served over 95,020 unique patients throughout its campuses. A decade later, the system had 277 inpatient beds in service, a child and adolescent inpatient psychiatric services at Somerville Campuses, and had expanded to twelve primary care centers and four teen health centers, showing the continued growth of its community health oriented model. In FY2022 CHA witnessed 9,265 discharges, 88,087 Emergency Department visits, 899,218 ambulatory visits, and 1,149 births.
