= National Agricultural Research, Extension, Education, and Economics Advisory Board =

The National Agricultural Research, Extension, Education, and Economics Advisory (NAREEE) Board is a 30-member board of the federal government of the United States. Established by the Food and Agriculture Act of 1977 (P.L. 95-223). In the Federal Agriculture Improvement and Reform Act of 1996 (P.L. 104-137 or the 1996 Farm Bill) NAREEE replaced three existing advisory committees. The Board, which was reauthorized through 2007 by the 2002 farm bill (P.L. 107–171, Sec. 7133), advises USDA on national priorities and policies related to food, agriculture, agricultural research, extension, education, and economics.

== Board Members ==
- Dr. Dana Allen-Tully, Gar-Lin Dairy, LLC
- Dr. Edmund Buckner, Alcorn State University
- Lisabeth Hobart, GROWMARK, Inc
- Dr. V.M. "Bala" Balasubramaniam, Ohio State University
- Dr. Mario Ferruzzi, University of Arkansas
- Dr. Kenrett Jefferson-Moore, North Carolina A&T State University
- Dr. Mark Lawrence, Mississippi State University
- Dr. Michael Oltrogge, Nebraska Indian Community College
- Dr. Ariel Ortiz-Bobea, Cornell University
- Dr. Annette Levi, California State University, Fresno
- Donnell Brown, National Grape Research Alliance
- Richard De Los Santos, Texas Department of Agriculture
- Marguerite Green, SPROUT
- Dr. Jane Kolodinsky, University of Vermont
- Tambra Raye Stevenson, Women Advancing Nutrition Dietetics and Agriculture (WANDA)
