= Reckful =

American professional esports player (1989–2020)

- Bernstein in 2020
- Born: Byron Daniel Bernstein; May 8, 1989; Los Angeles, California, U.S.
- Died: July 2, 2020 (aged 31); Austin, Texas, U.S.
- Years active: 2009–2020

Esports career information
- Games: World of Warcraft; Asheron's Call; Hearthstone

Team history
- 2009–2011: compLexity Gaming

Twitch information
- Channel: Reckful
- Genre: Gaming
- Followers: 901,000
- Last updated: December 12, 2025

Byron Daniel Bernstein (May 8, 1989 – July 2, 2020), better known as Reckful, was an American-Israeli Twitch streamer and professional esports player. He was best known in the gaming community for his achievements in World of Warcraft and Asheron's Call.

== Personal life ==
Byron Daniel Bernstein was born in a Jewish family to Itamar and Judith Bernstein in Los Angeles. He had two older brothers named Guy and Gary; Guy, the oldest, died by suicide when Bernstein was six. Bernstein said he was a "nerdy kid that no-one liked" in elementary school and was made fun of for his difficulty speaking English, which was his second language (his first was Hebrew). Bernstein said he was a gifted student who was good at math, but being made fun of discouraged him from participating in school. When he got into high school, he made friends at school but said his life revolved around playing the video game Asheron's Call, which fell out of popularity while World of Warcraft was gaining popularity, and he fell into bouts of depression and attempted to kill himself at 16. He later dropped out of high school, also due to depression. He said that he recognized that video games were a form of escapism for him.

Bernstein said his brother's death had a profound effect on his life and his subsequent struggles with depression. Bernstein was diagnosed with bipolar II disorder as a child. During a trip to Amsterdam, he tried psilocybin mushrooms, which he said helped him for the first time.

Bernstein died by suicide on July 2, 2020. He was 31 years old.

== Career ==
Bernstein was a professional World of Warcraft player, best-known for his innovative play-style of the "rogue" class, and a pioneer in video game live streaming on Twitch. His popularity in the game began when he finished in the top 0.1% of the competitive ladder without the use of what were considered essential gameplay mechanics at the time. He finished in the top 0.1% of the player base multiple competitive seasons in a row. He competed in a handful of tournaments and won Major League Gaming's World of Warcraft tournament in 2010.

In 2011, Bernstein released the gaming movie Reckful 3. It reached one million views within a week (as of January 2022, the video had over six million views). He later won the WarcraftMovies top-skilled contest, in which players cast their vote for player of the year. In 2012, he became a developer, operations manager, and concept designer at Feenix, a gaming mouse company. He created his YouTube channel in October 2012 and followed in November with his first video, Reckful 5 stack Taste for Blood.

In 2017, Bernstein was ranked fourth in The Gazette Review's list of top-ten richest streamers. He claimed to have a net worth of $1.5 million and was receiving up to 50,000 viewers per stream.

Bernstein played poker and entered the 2016 Unibet Open London main event, but was knocked out early. In November 2017, he played in a charity poker event sponsored by PokerGO. The event was won by itsHafu.

In May 2018, Bernstein created a podcast titled Tea Time with Byron. Episodes consisted of long-form interviews with notable guests in the gaming and streaming communities, such as Pokimane and Hikaru Nakamura. A total of six episodes were released, the last one on March 31, 2020.

Before his death, Bernstein was in the process of creating an MMO called Everland.

In August 2020, Blizzard and World of Warcraft paid tribute to Bernstein with an in-game trainer, named after his online alias Reckful. The character is placed inside the Cathedral of Light, an in-game landmark where the community gathered to pay Bernstein a tribute following the news of his death.

== LAN achievements ==
=== World of Warcraft ===
- 3rd Place MLG Dallas 2009
- 2nd Place MLG Orlando 2009
- 2nd Place MLG Columbus 2010
- 1st Place MLG Washington DC 2010

=== Hearthstone ===
- 3rd–4th Place 2013 Innkeeper's Invitational
