= Tufts University School of Medicine =

Private medical school in Boston, Massachusetts, US

Coordinates: 42.34985°N 71.06198°W

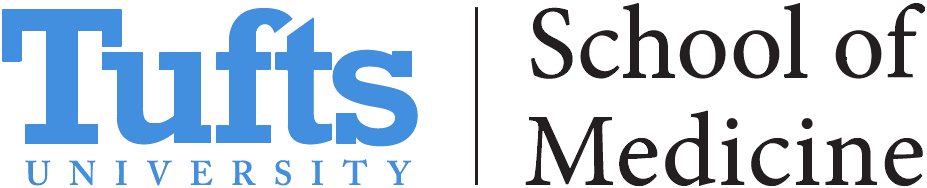
- Type: Private medical school
- Established: 1893
- Parent institution: Tufts University
- Dean: Helen Boucher
- Faculty: 3,925
- Students: 826
- Location: Boston, Massachusetts, U.S.
- Campus: Urban
- Hospital Affiliations: Tufts Medical Center St. Elizabeth's Medical Center Lahey Hospital & Medical Center
- Website: medicine.tufts.edu

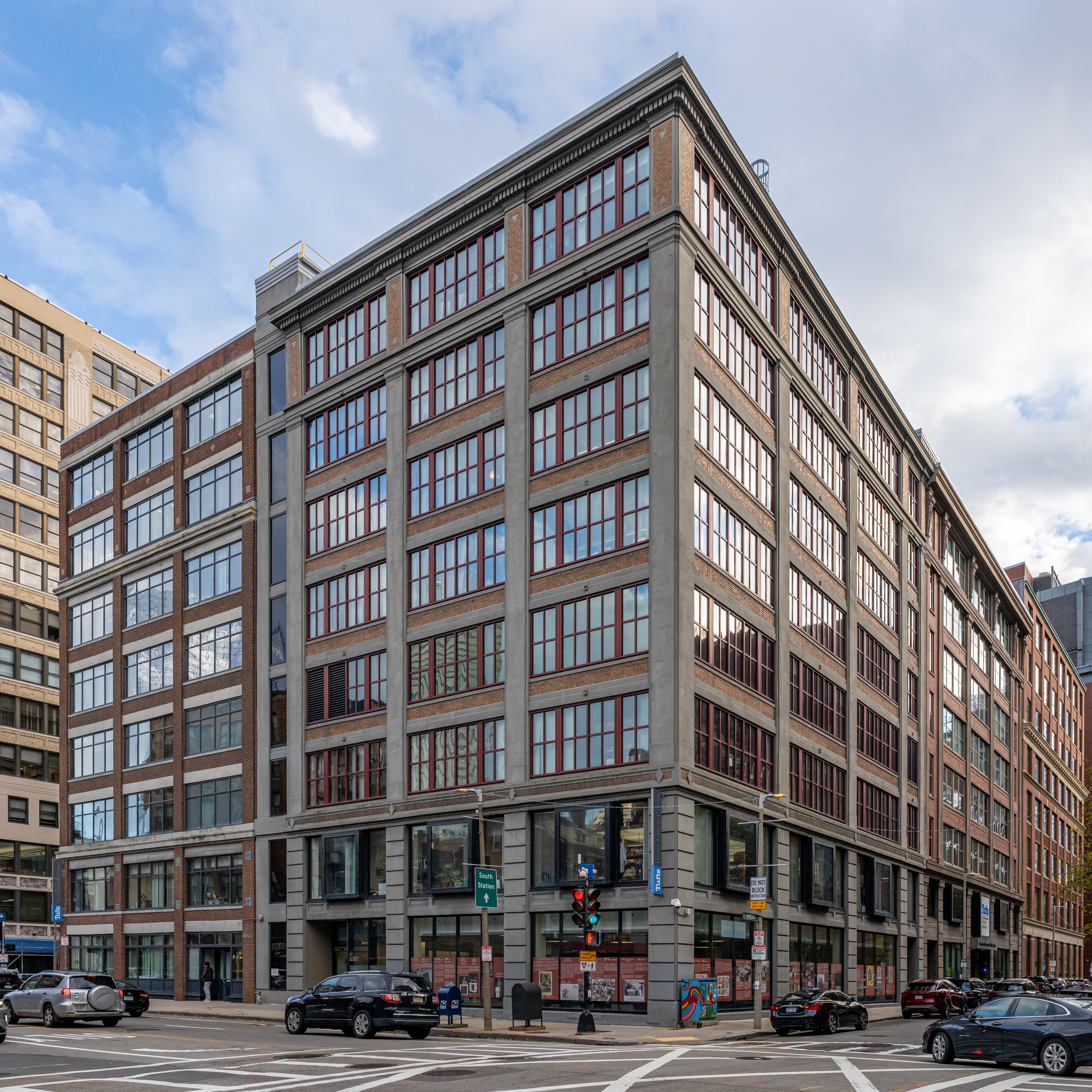
Arnold Wing from Kneeland Street (2025)

The Tufts University School of Medicine is the medical school of Tufts University, a private research university in Massachusetts. It was established in 1893 and is located on the university's health sciences campus in downtown Boston. It has clinical affiliations with numerous doctors and researchers in the United States and around the world, as well as with its affiliated hospitals in both Massachusetts (including Tufts Medical Center, St. Elizabeth's Medical Center, Lahey Hospital and Medical Center and Baystate Medical Center), and Maine (Maine Medical Center).

== History ==
The School of Medicine was established by vote of the Trustees of Tufts College on April 22, 1893. It was formed by the secession of seven faculty from the College of Physicians and Surgeons in Boston, a school which was formed in 1880. These "original seven" faculty members successfully lobbied to establish a medical school under the auspices of Tufts College. The new school, which was designated the Medical School of Tufts College, opened its doors in October 1893 with eighty students. The school was, from the very beginning, coeducational, and of the twenty-two students who graduated that first year, eight were women. When the trustees changed the name of the institution from "Tufts College" to "Tufts University" in 1954, the medical school became the "Tufts University School of Medicine."

The Tufts Medical Center, the principal teaching hospital of TUSM, came into existence in 1930 through the alliance of the Boston Dispensary, the Boston Floating Hospital for Children, and the Trustees of Tufts College. The New England Medical Center (NEMC) was established as a non-profit corporation to coordinate the administrative activities of its constituent organizations.

In 1946, the Pratt Diagnostic Clinic, an extension of the Boston Dispensary established in 1938, joined NEMC. In 1950, when the Medical School and Dental School relocated to Harrison Avenue, the NEMC became known as the New England Medical Center Hospital. The name of the institution changed to the Tufts New England Medical Center (T-NEMC) in 1968, to New England Medical Center in the 1980s, back to T-NEMC in 2002, and ultimately to the Tufts Medical Center in 2008. Over the years, the governing boards of Tufts University and the medical center negotiated a series of affiliation agreements. Tufts University and Tufts Medical Center are separate corporate entities. However, the president and several other senior officers of Tufts University are ex officio members of the board of directors of the Medical Center.

Notable past deans of the school include Lauro Cavazos (acting dean 1973–1975, dean 1975–1980), Harris Berman (interim dean 2009–2011, dean 2011–2019), and Helen Boucher (interim dean 2021–2022, dean 2022–present).

== Academics ==
In 2022, Tufts University was ranked #81 in clinical and health studies by Times Higher Education (THE), #201-300 by Academic Ranking of World Universities (ARWU), and #56 in medical research by US News.

== Affiliate teaching hospitals ==
The Tufts University School of Medicine does not directly own or operate any hospitals and instead relies on affiliate hospitals for clinical education and patient care. While medical students can spend time at any of the affiliate centers, they primarily complete their clinical experiences at Tufts Medical Center.

- Atrius Health
- Baystate Medical Center
- Boston Children's Hospital
- Brigham and Women's Faulkner Hospital
- Cambridge Health Alliance
- Carney Hospital
- Good Samaritan Medical Center
- Lawrence General Hospital
- Lahey Hospital & Medical Center
- Lemuel Shattuck Hospital
- Lowell General Hospital
- Maine Medical Center
- MelroseWakefield Hospital
- MetroWest Medical Center
- New England Baptist Hospital
- Newton-Wellesley Hospital
- Salem Hospital
- St. Elizabeth's Medical Center
- South Shore Hospital
- VA Boston Healthcare System
- Winchester Hospital

== Notable people ==
- Wael Al-Husami, Jordanian cardiologist and interventional cardiologist
- Harold Bornstein, gastroenterologist, former personal physician to Donald Trump
- Helen Boucher, director of the Tufts Center for Integrated Management of Antimicrobial Resistance
- Lauro Cavazos, dean of Tufts University School of Medicine (1975–1980), and United States secretary of education (1988–1990)
- Anna Quincy Churchill, professor of anatomy 1923–1954
- Jane F. Desforges, hematologist and professor of medicine
- Louise Eisenhardt, neuropathologist, first female president of the American Association of Neurological Surgeons, famous for her work with Harvey Cushing
- Michael Greger, physician, author, and professional speaker on public health issues, best known for his advocacy of a whole-food, plant-based diet
- Sara Murray Jordan, gastroenterologist, first female present of the American Gastroenterological Association
- Alok Kanojia, psychiatrist, co-founder of the co-founder of the mental health coaching company Healthy Gamer, streams interviews on Twitch
- John S. Kauer, professor emeritus
- Eunice D. Kinney, first female physician to testify as an expert before the U.S. circuit court
- Joseph Barnett Kirsner, gastroenterologist, academic and pioneer in the field of digestive system disorders
- George D. LeMaitre, vascular surgeon, author, and surgical device inventor
- Stuart B. Levy, deceased, professor and founder of the Center of Integrated Management of Antibiotic Resistance, CSO and inventor of Nuzyra at Paratek Pharmaceuticals
- Roderick MacKinnon, 2003 Nobel Prize winner for his work on ion channels, professor of Molecular Neurobiology and Biophysics at Rockefeller University
- Helen Abbott Michael, chemist and pioneer in phytochemistry
- Mark L. Nelson, inventor of Nuzyra, an antibiotic and the first therapeutic drug FDA-approved invented at Tufts University
- Eric Rubin, editor-in-chief of The New England Journal of Medicine, microbiologist and infectious disease specialist, adjunct professor at Harvard T.H. Chan School of Public Health
- Gerhard Schmidt, biochemist
- Julia Seton (1862–1950), physician, lecturer and author
- Tambra Raye Stevenson, entrepreneur and nutritionist
- John Q. Trojanowski, neurological researcher and professor specializing in neurodegenerative disease
- Josefa Zaratt, first African-American woman to graduate from Tufts Medical School
