= Gaebler Children's Center =

- Massachusetts Department of Mental Health
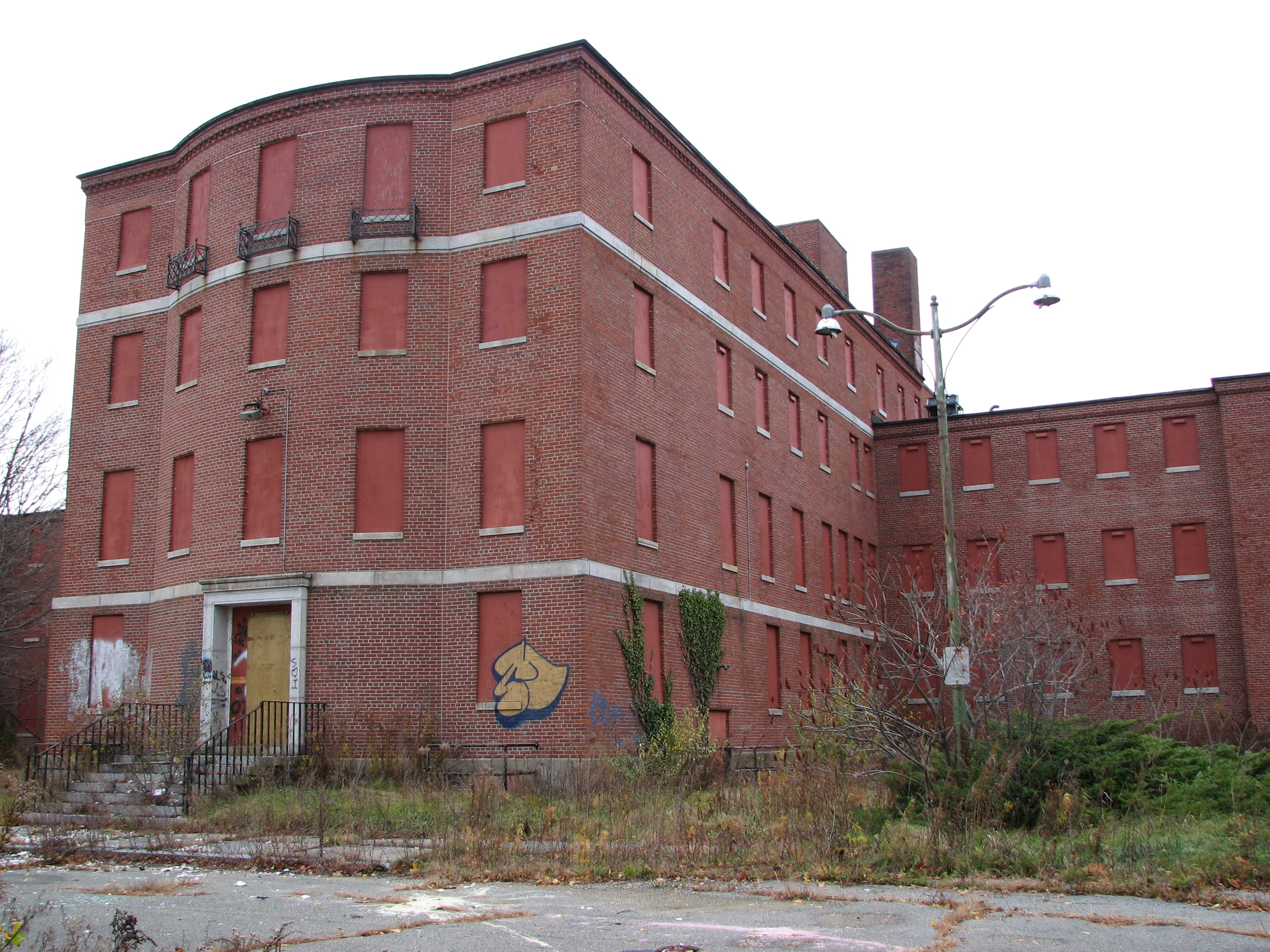

Geography
- Location: Waltham, Massachusetts, United States
- Coordinates: 42°23′54″N 71°12′29″W

History
- Opened: October 8, 1955
- Closed: September 1992

Gaebler Children's Center was a psychiatric institution operated by the Massachusetts Department of Mental Health for severely mentally ill children and adolescents, located in Waltham, Massachusetts.

The center opened on October 8, 1955, near the grounds of the Metropolitan State Hospital and closed in September 1992. It was named after William C. Gaebler, the second superintendent of the Metropolitan State Hospital. The Massachusetts Department of Mental Health (DMH) closed the center as it was antiquated and could no longer serve the needs of the children it housed. According to the DMH, this closure coincided with the decision to place mentally ill children in community settings instead of in institutional settings. Others felt the center was closed due to budget cuts.

According to the Waltham Land Trust and The Boston Globe, the grounds of the Gaebler Center are currently being considered for redevelopment. (The Gaebler Center is now slated for Demolition with bids to be received prior to April 15, 2010)

Demolition and site development contractor Testa Corp won the bid to begin destruction of the area, as indicated by a sign recently erected at the entrance.

Mayor Jeanette McCarthy said the building was bought by the city of Waltham in 2005 in order to have some control over the development of the seven-acre site. Demolition of the Gaebler Children's Center was completed in January 2011. The work cost the City of Waltham approximately $637,000. There are no current plans for the 55-acre lot.
