= Watch City Steampunk Festival =

- Status: active
- Genre: Steampunk
- Frequency: Annually
- Location: Waltham, MA
- Years active: 12
- Inaugurated: 2010
- Attendance: Est. 5000+
- Patron: Downtown Waltham Partnership (2015-current) Charles River Museum (2010-2013)
- Website: www.watchcityfestival.com

Watch City Steampunk Festival, previously known as "International Steampunk City" and the "Watch City Festival," is the oldest annual open-air, indoor/outdoor steampunk festival in the United States, and is held in Waltham, Massachusetts. It began in 2011 as a fundraiser by and for the benefit of the Charles River Museum of Industry and Innovation, which suffered significant flood damage in March 2010. The original event pioneered a new model of science fiction convention in which the broader, non-fandom public community was deliberately engaged by presenting events and programming in city spaces and local businesses often free to the public. This is still a primary feature of the Festival today.

According to then CRMII Executive Director and first Festival Director Elln Hagny, the event was inspired by the success of two events in 2010: the New England Steampunk Festival and a steampunk exhibit, organized by Bruce Rosenbaum of ModVic, called "Steampunk: Form & Function," the first steampunk exhibit featured in a major American museum.

The Charles River Museum ceased its direct involvement in organizing the Festival after 2013. There was no festival in 2014.

In 2015, renamed the Watch City Steampunk Festival, the event returned. Now under the auspices of the Downtown Waltham Partnership, a Waltham-based nonprofit supporting the city's community, it became a more city-centric event.

In addition to that significant change, the 2015 Festival calendar was scaled back slightly to evening events on Friday and the full outdoor festival occurring only on Saturday (previous years had the Festival continuing through until Sunday), allowing for a Sunday rain date in the event of inclement weather. 2015 was the first year that the full schedule of daytime festival events was entirely free to the public.

The Festival brought in an estimated Saturday attendance of over 10,000 at the 2015 event.

While the programming is typical of a steampunk festival, including art exhibitions, panel discussions on a variety of topics, steampunk music, crafts workshops, vendors, and performances, the Watch City Steampunk Festival makes extensive use of its host city's public spaces and Waltham's place in the history of American industry. It fosters interaction with both local businesses and organizations, making it truly a Waltham community event.

The Festival continued in 2016, with a Friday evening gala on May 6 and the main festival on Saturday, May 7. In 2017, with the Friday, May 12 evening event included a free, outdoor circus-style fire performance preceding the kickoff gala, and the main event held on the Common on Saturday, May 13.

The Festival date for 2018 was May 12 with a day-long circus theme. This year was the first without a Friday night event. There was rain throughout the day. As a result, attendance was slightly down from prior years. Still, the 2018 Festival was a success, with the steampunk attendees and public defying the weather to enjoy the activities and attractions.

The 2019 Watch City Steampunk Festival was held Saturday, May 11, with a Friday evening kickoff dinner featuring featured festival performer Professor Elemental.

The 2020 Watch City Steampunk Festival was cancelled due to COVID-19.

The 2021 Festival was present as an online-only event on May 8, 2021. The festival theme was a historical/literary pastiche pitting puppet versions of Jules Verne and H.G. Welles against one another in a fictional race to the moon.

In July 2021, Saturday, May 7, 2022 was announced as the date for the first in-person festival in almost three years. The event, with finale performer highlight Celtica Nova, was held successfully and was extremely well-attended and received.

The Festival's website has announced that the next event will be Saturday, May 13, 2023.

== Past events ==
- 2010 - "New England Steampunk Festival"
- 2011 - May 7–8: Titled "International Steampunk City"
- 2012 - May 11–13: Titled "Watch City Festival"
- 2013 - May 10–12: Titled "Watch City Festival"
- 2015 - May 8 (Friday evening concert gala) and May 9 (Main festival)
- 2016 - May 6 (Friday evening concert gala) and May 7 (Main festival)
- 2017 - May 12 (Friday evening concert gala) and May 13 (Main festival)
- 2018 - May 12 (Main Festival, no Friday Evening event)
- 2019 - May 10 (Friday "An Evening with Professor Elemental") and May 11 (Main festival): Titled "Watch City Steampunk Festival"
- 2020 - Cancelled due to COVID-19
- 2021 - May 8 (Online only)
- 2022 - May 7 (First in-person Festival since 2019)
- 2023 - May 13
