= Steampunk City =

Annual steampunk festival in Waltham, Massachusetts, US

International Steampunk City
- ISC logo
- Genre: Steampunk
- Frequency: Annual WALWaltham
- Locations: Morristown, New Jersey, US
- Years active: 15
- Inaugurated: 2011
- Attendance: 10,000+
- Website: internationalsteampunkcity.com

International Steampunk City was an annual steampunk festival held in the Historic Speedwell area of Morristown, New Jersey, United States.

In Waltham it was held as a fundraiser for the benefit of the Charles River Museum of Industry, which suffered significant flood damage from the Charles River in March 2010.

It was originally a one-day festival called "Steampunk Festival", located inside the museum itself. It had an attendance upwards of 1,000.

For the second year, the museum's Executive Director, Elln Hagney, had a vision of a much larger festival, similar to the conventions that the steampunk community was used to. The museum worked with a committee composed of members of the steampunk community and many local business professionals to make the festival possible.

In 2011, the festival was renamed "International Steampunk City", and spanned the downtown area of Waltham, including the museum itself and the Waltham Watch Company building. Attendance reached 10,000 through the weekend. The programming was typical of a fan convention, including an art show, panel discussions on a variety of topics, steampunk music, craft workshops, vendors, and performances. Unlike many steampunk events, the museum leveraged its own exhibits and relationships with local businesses to arrange discounts for event attendees. This cooperation also allowed the event to use many outdoor spaces as well as indoor stages.

There was no show in 2020 as officials cited the COVID-19 pandemic as grounds for cancellation.

It is done in conjunction with the Steampunk World's Fair and New York City's Steampunk Anachronism.

Entertainment includes:

- Hourly guided thematic tours of the historic Vail House
- Self-guided tours through an interactive exhibit in the National Historic Landmark Factory Building
- Hands-on experiment-based workshops
- Staff-led lectures on the origins of steampunk, the Crystal Palace Exhibition, and the historic fashions in the life of England's Queen Victoria
- Blacksmithing demonstrations
- Industrial archaeology tours of the site's functional over-shot waterwheel
- Children's craft and dress-up station
- Interpretations of 19th-century death and mourning customs with a historically accurate hearse
