= Bruce Rosenbaum =

American artist and designer (born 1962)

- Born: February 4, 1962 (age 64); Boston, Massachusetts, United States

Bruce Rosenbaum was born on February 4, 1962, in Boston, MA is an American artist and designer renowned for his contributions to Steampunk design. He has gained recognition for his work in both his home, known as The Steampunk House, and through his company, ModVic ( Shorten from "Modern Victorian"). The Wall Street Journal has dubbed him the "steampunk guru," while Wired Magazine has referred to him as a "steampunk evangelist."

== Early life ==
Rosenbaum grew up in Marblehead, Massachusetts, and attended Marblehead High School, before earning his bachelor's degree in Business at UMASS Amherst. After graduating UMASS, Rosenbaum worked as a Department Manager for Lord and Taylor in Stamford, Connecticut where he met his wife Melanie. Later, Rosenbaum attended Duke University and received his MBA. After graduating Duke University, he worked for Sara Lee Direct in Winston-Salem, North Carolina, and then worked for other direct marketing agencies. Rosenbaum, along with his wife, Melanie, started a direct-mail marketing business, N2N Direct, in the 1990s.

== Design career ==
Rosenbaum and his wife started ModVic (short for Modern Victorian), a Victorian-home restoration company, in 2007. Combining original Victorian design with modern functionality, the couple completed one major project before the economy's downturn. They then refocused the business on integrating new technologies and appliances into restored period objects.

Along with producing commissioned pieces for clients, Rosenbaum incorporates his design perspective into his family home in Sharon, Massachusetts, popularly known as the "Steampunk House". Their home is also noted as the only functional steampunk art home in the world and has been featured on MTV's Extreme Cribs.

Rosenbaum's projects include a personal computer workstation housed in a Victorian pump organ, a 6-foot mechanical whale for a hotel in Nantucket, Massachusetts, and a late 1800s bandsaw repurposed as a conference table and workstation.

Rosenbaum is also the Chairman of The Sharon Historic Commission, Sharon, MA, and a Trustee of the Charles River Museum of Industry & Innovation, Waltham, Massachusetts.

Additionally, along with Dr. Ashleigh Hillier, an associate Psychology Professor at UMASS Lowell, Rosenbaum has created a 9-week program called Steampunkinetics: Building Art into Science for kids on the autism spectrum. The program uses 'Janusian Thinking' and other creative problem-solving techniques to turn STEM (Science, Technology, Engineering, and Math) into STEAM (adding art) into STEAMPUNK (adding history).

== Events ==
=== 2010 ===
- ModVic Steampunk Art Exhibition, Steampunk World's Fair, Piscataway NJ
- Steampunk @ Boston Antique & Design Show, Shriner's Auditorium, Wilmington, MA
- Steampunk @ Pier Show, Pier 94 – Chelsea, New York NY

=== 2011 ===
- Nemo's Steampunk Art and Invention Gallery, 20,000 Leagues, 5-Wits Attraction, Foxboro MA
- Back Home to Future Expo, Greater Philadelphia Expo Center, Oaks, PA
- Mobilis in Mobili: An Exhibition of Art & Appliance, Wooster Street Social Club (NY Ink), New York, NY
- ModVic's World of Steampunk Art & Design, Watch City Festival – Charles River Museum, Waltham MA
- Norman Rockwell Museum Goes Back to the Future with Steampunk Night, Norman Rockwell Museum, Stockbridge MA
- Steampunk Bizarre Exhibition, Mark Twain Museum, Hartford CT
- Steampunk Form & Function Sh & Exhibition, Charles River Museum of Industry and Innovation, Waltham MA
- ModVic with East Coast Paranormal Research Team, Benjamin Stanley Freeman House, 390 Mount Hope Street, North Attleboro MA

=== 2012 ===
- How to Architect Steampunk into Your Design - Steampunk for Architects, ArchitectureBoston Expo (ABX), Boston MA
- Steampunkinetics Gallery Show, AFA Gallery – SOHO, New York, NY
- Living Steampunk, Boskone 49 – Regional Science Fiction Convention, Boston Westin Waterfront, Boston MA
- ModVic's World of Steampunk Art & Design, Watch City Festival – Charles River Museum, Waltham MA
- Living Steampunk, Dickens Festival, Salem MA
- Steampunk Dickens and his Villain Heads, Pollard Public Library, Lowell MA
- Steampunk @ CraftBoston, World Trade Center, Boston MA
- Steampunk @ Metro Show, New York NY
- ModVic's World of Steampunk Art & Design, Steampunk Industrial Revolution Festival, Nashua NH
- Living Steampunk, FaerieCon, Baltimore MD
- Steampunk Soiree Steamer and Exhibition, Revolving Museum, Lowell MA
- Steampunk Form & Function Show & Exhibition II, Charles River Museum of Industry and Innovation, Waltham MA
- Designing Steampunk, DESIGN East, Boston MA
- Steampunk @ Antique City, Schaut's Fun Fair, Bethlehem PA
- Steampunk @ Brimfield Antique Show, Brimfield MA
- Steampunk Historical House Tour, Sharon Historical Society, Sharon MA

=== 2013 ===
- ModVic's World of Steampunk Art & Design, RiverFest – Assembly Row, Somerville MA
- Steampunk: Nature & Machine, Lockwood Mathews Mansion, Norwalk CT
- Designing Steampunk, CreativeMornings Boston, Boston MA
- Time Machines: Robots, Rockets and Steampunk, Shelburne Museum, Shelburne VT
- Victorian Extreme: American Fancywork and Steampunk, 1850 – Now, Bennington Museum, Bennington VT
- Steampunk Dickens and his Villain Heads, WaterFire Festival, Old Stone Bank, Providence RI
- Plasma Light Art and Steampunk Design, International Assn. of Lighting Designers, Charles River Museum, Waltham MA
- ModVic's World of Steampunk Art & Design, Watch City Festival – Charles River Museum, Waltham MA
- Steampunk @ Pier Show Pier 94 – Chelsea, New York NY
- Steampunkinetics Rube Goldberg Exhibition’, Northeast Arc, Danvers MA
- Steampunk House Tours, Groupon, Sharon MA
- 20,000 Leagues Steampunk Gala, 5 Wits, Foxboro MA

=== 2014 ===
- Steampunk Springfield: Reimagining an Industrial City, March 21 through September 28, Citywide: Springfield Museums, Springfield Armory, UMASS Amherst, Central Library, City-Stage Theater and Springfield Symphony – Springfield, MA
- SteamAble: The Steampunk Wheelchair Project –Florence, MA
