= Walter E. Fernald =

American physician and administrator (1859–1924)

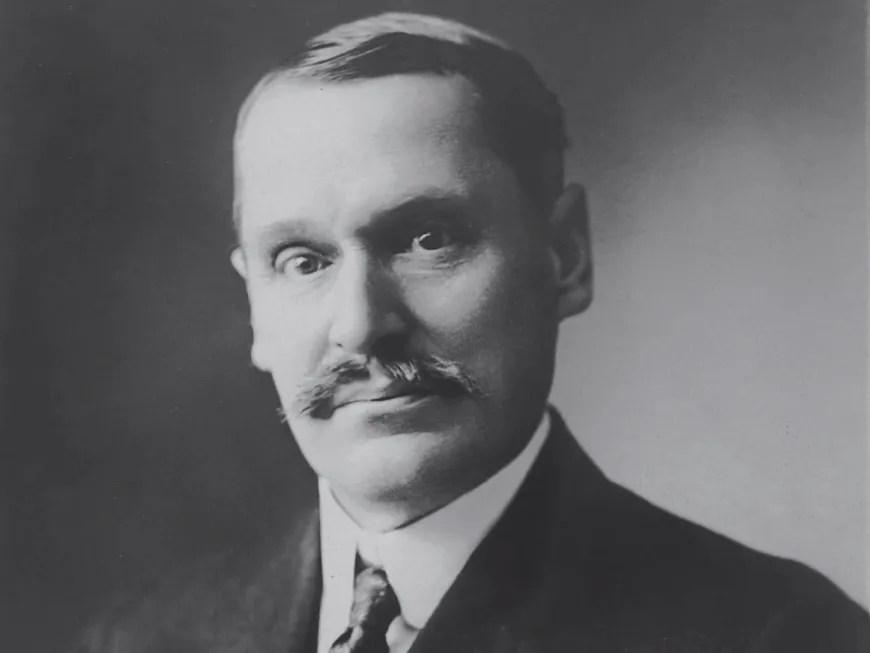
- Born: February 11, 1859; Kittery, Maine
- Died: November 26, 1924 (aged 58); Waltham, Massachusetts, U.S.
- Occupations: Physician and Superintendent at the Massachusetts School for the Feeble-Minded
- Known for: Development of special education and institutionalization of the intellectually and developmentally disabled

Academic background
- Education: The Medical School of Maine at Bowdoin College

Walter E. Fernald (February 11, 1859 – November 26, 1924) was an American physician and institutional administrator best known for his long tenure as superintendent of the Massachusetts School for the Feeble-Minded in Waltham, Massachusetts. Fernald was a nationally influential figure in the early development of institutions for people with intellectual disabilities.

== Early life and education ==
Walter Elmore Fernald was born in 1859 in Kittery, Maine. He earned his medical degree from The Medical School of Maine at Bowdoin College and trained as a young physician at an asylum in Wisconsin.

== Career ==
Fernald was appointed superintendent of the Massachusetts School for the Feeble-Minded in 1887, a position he held until his death in 1924. Under his leadership, Fernald moved the school, founded in 1848 by Samuel Gridley Howe, from its rundown campus in Boston to an 196-acre campus in nearby Waltham. There he designed and managed every aspect of the institution's design. The school soon became viewed as a model educational facility in the field of mental retardation and doctors and politicians from across the world traveled to Waltham to study the methods employed at the center.

In 1896, Fernald developed the first curriculum for disabled students at public schools. This initial curriculum, in Providence, Rhode Island, spurred the creation of thousands of special education classes all over the country. In addition, in 1899 Fernald led the establishment of The Templeton Colony, the first independent farm colony for the intellectually disabled

In the early 20th century Fernald became an important figure in the eugenics movement, advocating for the segregation of mentally disabled children from society and coining the term “Defective Delinquent” to describe criminally-inclined mentally disabled children. He championed the work of leading eugenicist, Henry H. Goddard, who introduced the IQ test and the term "moron". Residents at the school began to be housed there indefinitely.

By the 1910s, his views began to shift. In 1915, his testimony in the court case Osborn v. Thompson helped force the repeal of New York's sterilization law and aided his ultimately successful effort to politically dismantle the eugenicists’ organizing body. In 1924, as president of the American Association for the Study of the Feeble-Minded, he called for a radical “decentralization” away from institutions. He spoke against the segregation of most mentally disabled children, rejected IQ tests, and called for supporting community education and out-patient clinics.

In 1913, he received honorary master's from Harvard University and was a lecturer on mental diagnosis of children from 1920 until his death.

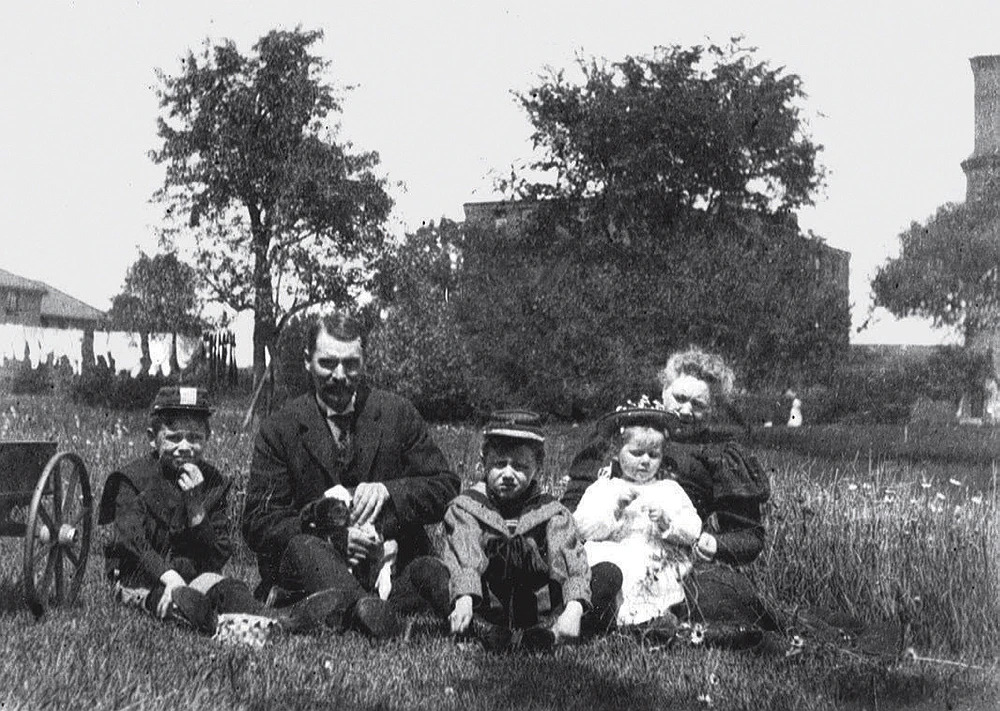
Walter Jr., Walter Sr., Tom, Helen, and Kate Fernald in the late 1890s

== Personal life ==
Fernald was married to Kate Fernald and had three children: Helen Fernald, Thomas Fernald, and Walter E. Fernald Jr.

== Death ==
Walter E. Fernald died on November 26, 1924. Flags flew at half-mass across the state and The Massachusetts School for the Feeble-Minded was renamed in his honor the following year.

== Legacy ==
The New England Journal of Medicine called Fernald “the pioneer in treating the mentally deficient,” citing “his broadness of vision, especially towards a problem which many people before his time saw only in the narrowest possible manner.”

By the time of his death many of his ideas about segregating the disabled had entered the medical mainstream. This led to a large network of state institutions, reaching a peak of roughly 230,000 inmates in 1967, where tremendous physical, sexual, and emotional abuse occurred. The Fernald School itself became a site of abuse and controversy, most infamously in the 1946–53 joint experiments by Harvard University and MIT that exposed young male children to tracer doses of radioactive isotopes in their oatmeal. The institution closed in 2014.

In 2025, Harvard lecturer and disability activist Alex Green wrote a biography of Fernald titled A Perfect Turmoil: Walter E. Fernald and the Struggle to Care for America’s Disabled that won the 2025 National Book Critics Circle Award for Biography

== See also ==
- Fernald State School
- Eugenics
- Intellectual disability
