= Margaret Henderson Floyd =

American art historian

Margaret Henderson Floyd (1932 – 18 October 1997) was Professor of Architectural History at Tufts University. She was an expert on Boston architecture. Her writing includes several titles on the work of late 19th-century American architects including Henry Hobson Richardson, and Longfellow, Alden and Harlow.

== Biography ==
Margaret Henderson Floyd was a graduate of Wellesley College, the University of New Mexico, and Boston University, where she received her Ph.D. in 1975. She taught for many years at Tufts where she was Professor of American Art and Architectural History.

Over the years, she developed detailed knowledge of the architecture of the Boston area and she became deeply involved in historic preservation and often provided expert testimony in an effort to save older buildings from demolition. She played a key role in the preservation of the Robert Treat Paine Estate in Waltham; she was one of four founding members of Friends of Longfellow House formed to support Longfellow House–Washington's Headquarters National Historic Site.

Floyd was a contributor to the ongoing reassessment of the "standard narrative" of nineteenth-century American architectural history. Her work on Longfellow, Alden and Harlow argued for a broader appreciation of the wide influence of the architect Henry Hobson Richardson. Her final book, a biographical monograph on Richardson was published after her death from cancer.

In her memory, the Department of Art and Architectural History at Tufts established the Floyd Lecture Series in 1999 and the Architectural Studies Prize in 2005.

== Books ==
Writings by Margaret Henderson Floyd include the following books (in chronological order):

- Bunting, Bainbridge, completed and edited by Margaret Henderson Floyd, Harvard: An Architectural History, Belknap Press of Harvard University Press, Cambridge MA 1985. ISBN 0-674-37290-5
- Floyd, Margaret Henderson, editor, Architectural Education and Boston: Centennial Publication of the Boston Architectural Center, 1889-1989, Boston Architectural Center, Boston 1989. ISBN 0-9624098-0-4, ISBN 0-9624098-1-2
- Floyd, Margaret Henderson, Architecture after Richardson: Regionalism before Modernism--Longfellow, Alden, and Harlow in Boston and Pittsburgh, University of Chicago Press with Pittsburgh History and Landmarks Foundation Chicago and Pittsburgh 1994. ISBN 0-226-25410-0
- Floyd, Margaret Henderson, Henry Hobson Richardson: A Genius for Architecture, Monacelli, New York 1997. ISBN 1-885254-70-9

== See also ==
- Women in the art history field
