= Templeton Developmental Center =

Historical hospital in Massachusetts

- Commonwealth of Massachusetts

Geography
- Location: Templeton, Massachusetts, United States
- Coordinates: 42°35′59″N 72°7′8″W

History
- Former name: Templeton Farm Colony
- Opened: 1899
- Closed: 2015

Links
- Lists: Hospitals in Massachusetts
- Templeton Farm Colony
- U.S. National Register of Historic Places
- U.S. Historic district
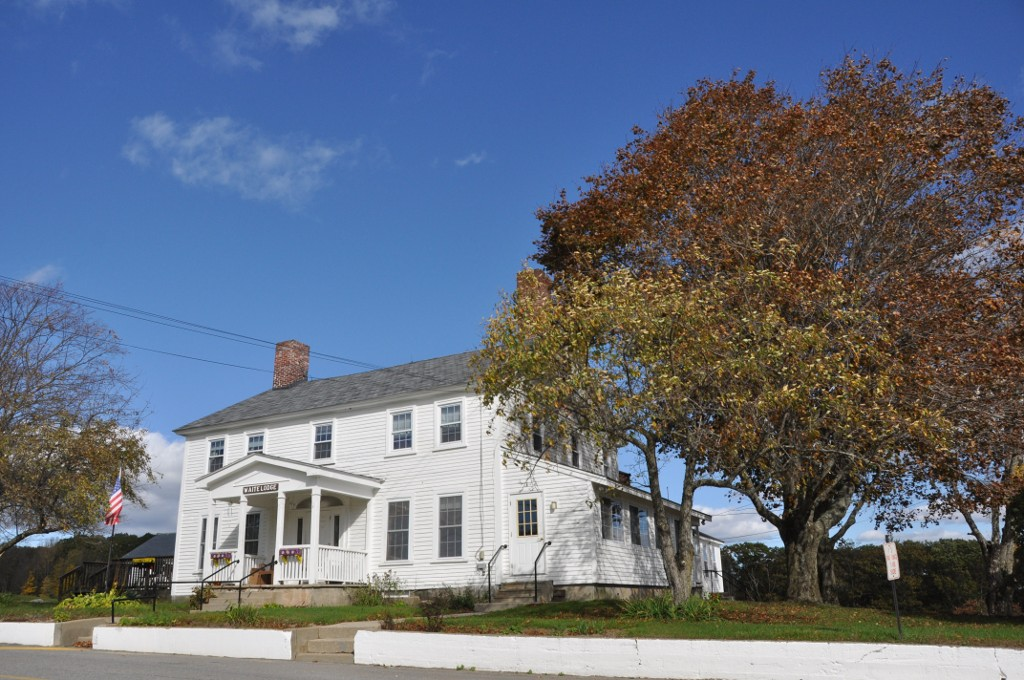
- Waite House, one of the facility's historic structures

- Location within Massachusetts Location within the United States
- Location: Templeton, Massachusetts
- Area: 2,600 acres (1,100 ha)
- Built: 1899
- Architect: William G. Preston
- Architectural style: Federal, Bungalow/Craftsman
- MPS: Massachusetts State Hospitals And State Schools MPS
- NRHP reference No.: 93001485
- Added to NRHP: January 21, 1994

The Templeton Developmental Center was a state-run facility for mentally disabled people located in Templeton, in the U.S. state of Massachusetts. Founded as the Templeton Farm Colony in 1899 through the efforts of Walter E. Fernald, superintendent of what is now called the Fernald School in Waltham, Massachusetts, it was considered an innovative and progressive facility for managing the state's developmentally disabled population at the time. The large facility was closed in 2015, with some intermediate care facilities remaining open on the campus. The property and some of the buildings were listed on the National Register of Historic Places in 1994.

== History ==
The Templeton Farm Colony was established in 1899, when the state purchased 1,600 acres (650 ha) of farmland west of the village of Baldwinville in rural Templeton. The original 18th and 19th-century farmsteads of this large parcel were adapted by the state into four distinct "colonies", which operated independently of each other under the management of a single administrator. Additions were made to existing farm structures, and new dormitory and service facilities were constructed over a period extending mainly through the 1920s. The original parcel was enlarged by the purchase of another 1,000 acres (400 ha) in the 1910s and 1920s. The patient population of the colony was engaged in farming, as well as construction and maintenance of the facilities. It received national and international recognition for its innovative approach to providing a productive working environment for developmentally disabled boys and men.

The state began to phase out farming activity at the colony in the 1970s. Changing trends, primarily that of preferring smaller-scale local settings for developmentally disabled people, have led to a decline the population. Following calls to close the facility, it was largely shuttered in 2015. Most of the property is now managed by the state's department for asset and property management; a smaller resident treatment facility continues to operate on the grounds.

== See also ==
- National Register of Historic Places listings in Worcester County, Massachusetts
