= Walter E. Fernald Developmental Center =

Historical hospital in Waltham, Massachusetts, US

- Massachusetts Department of Mental Retardation

Geography
- Location: Waltham, Massachusetts, United States
- Coordinates: 42°23′28″N 71°12′38″W

Services
- Emergency department: No

History
- Former name: Walter E. Fernald State School
- Opened: 1848
- Closed: 2014

Links
- Lists: Hospitals in Massachusetts
- Walter E. Fernald State School, Waltham, MA.
- U.S. National Register of Historic Places
- U.S. Historic district
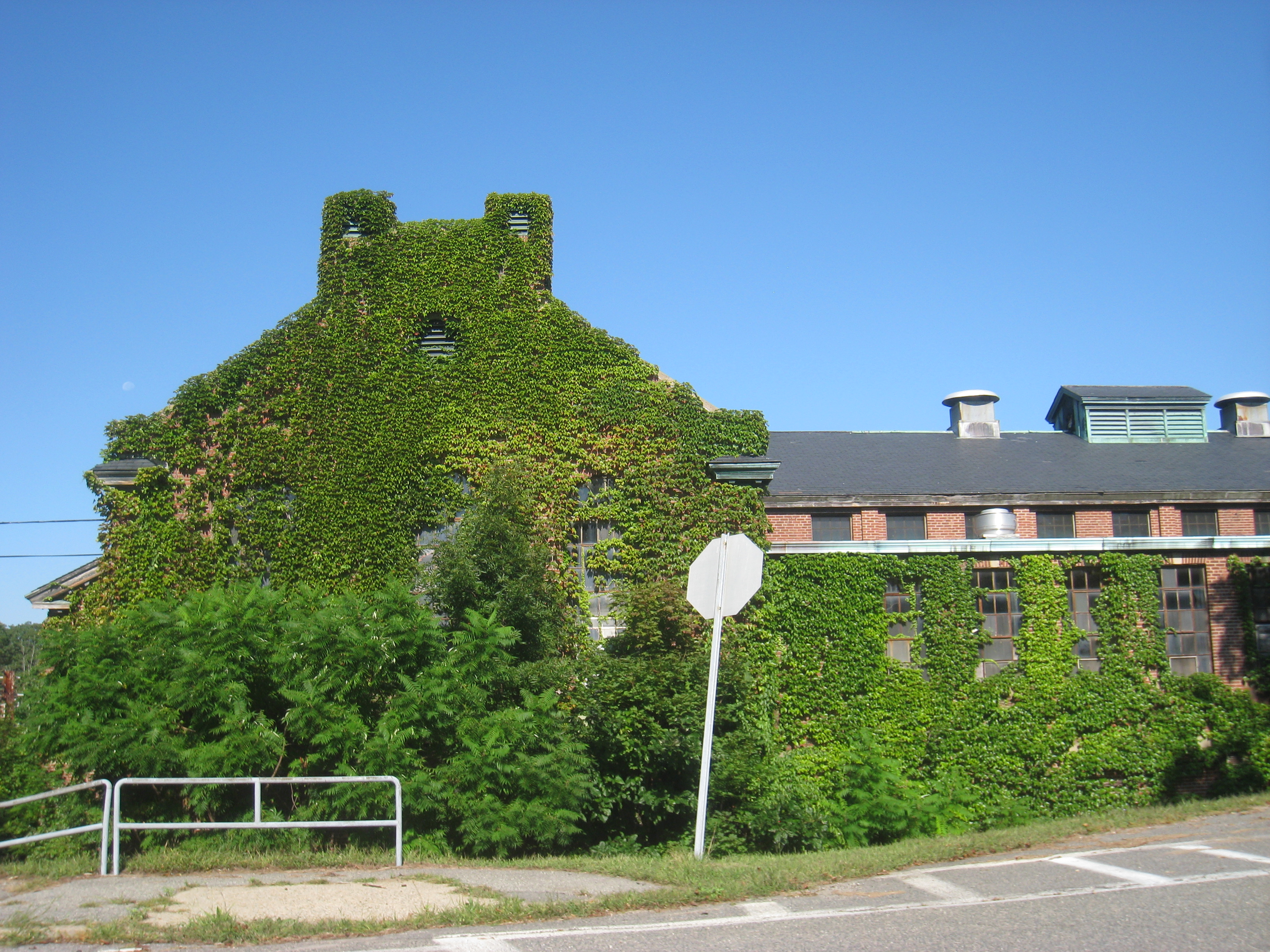

- Location within Massachusetts Location within the United States
- Location: 200 Trapelo Rd., Waltham, Massachusetts
- Built: 1888
- Architect: William G. Preston; Clarence P. Hoyt
- Architectural style: Greek Revival, Queen Anne, Late 19th And 20th Century Revivals
- MPS: Massachusetts State Hospitals And State Schools MPS
- NRHP reference No.: 93001487
- Added to NRHP: January 21, 1994

The Walter E. Fernald State School, later the Walter E. Fernald Developmental Center, was the Western Hemisphere's oldest publicly funded institution serving people with developmental disabilities. Under its third superintendent, Walter E. Fernald, it became a model for state institutions for the developmentally disabled. It later was the scene of medical experiments in the 20th century. Investigations into this research led to new regulations regarding human research in children.

The school occupies a 186 acres (75 ha) property off Trapelo Road in Waltham, Massachusetts.

== History ==
=== Early history ===
The Fernald Center, originally called the Experimental School for Teaching and Training Idiotic Children, was founded in Boston by reformer Samuel Gridley Howe in 1848 with a $2,500 appropriation from the Massachusetts State Legislature. The school gradually moved to a new permanent location in Waltham between 1888 and 1891. It eventually encompassed 72 buildings across 196 acres (0.79 km^{2}). At its peak, the school confined some 2,500 people, most of them "feeble-minded" boys.

Under its third superintendent, Walter E. Fernald (1859–1924), the school was viewed as a model educational facility in the field of mental retardation and doctors and politicians from across the country and the world would travel to Waltham to study the methods employed at the center. Fernald was instrumental in the establishment of the first independent farm colony for the disabled (The Templeton Colony) and early concepts of special education. However, though he never supported forced sterilization, Fernald was an important figure in the eugenics movement, advocating for the segregation of mentally disabled children from society and coining the term “Defective Delinquent” to describe criminally-inclined mentally disabled children. It wasn’t until the end of his life that he had a reversal of many of these ideas, fighting against the segregation of most mentally disabled children, rejecting IQ tests, and supporting community education and out-patient clinics. However, by this time, many of his ideas about forced segregation and mass institutionalization had already entered the American mainstream. The school was renamed in his honor in 1925, following his death the previous year.

The institution did serve a large population of children with cognitive disabilities (referred to as "mentally retarded children"), but The Boston Globe estimates that upwards of half of the inmates tested with IQs in the normal range. In the 20th century, living conditions were spartan or worse; approximately 36 children slept in each dormitory room. There were also reports of physical and sexual abuse.

=== Nuclear medicine research in children ===
The Fernald School was the site of the 1946–53 joint experiments by Harvard University and MIT that exposed young male children to tracer doses of radioactive isotopes. Documents obtained in 1994 by the United States Department of Energy revealed the following details:

- The experiment was conducted in part by a research fellow sponsored by the Quaker Oats Company. Part of the study involved adding radioactive iron and calcium into oatmeal and milk, then feeding the mixture to Fernald students.
- MIT Professor of Nutrition Robert S. Harris led the experiment, which studied the absorption of calcium and iron.
- The boys were encouraged to join a "Science Club", which offered larger portions of food, parties, and trips to Boston Red Sox baseball games.
- The 57 club members ate iron-enriched cereals and calcium-enriched milk for breakfast. In order to track absorption, several radioactive calcium tracers were given orally or intravenously.
- Radiation levels in stool and blood samples would serve as dependent variables.
- In another study, 17 subjects received iron supplement shots containing radioisotopes of iron.
- Neither the children nor their parents ever gave adequate informed consent for participation in a scientific study.

The Advisory Committee on Human Radiation Experiments, reporting to the United States Department of Energy in 1994, reported on these experiments:

In 1946, one study exposed seventeen subjects to radioactive iron. The second study, which involved a series of seventeen related subexperiments, exposed fifty-seven subjects to radioactive calcium between 1950 and 1953. It is clear that the doses involved were low and that it is extremely unlikely that any of the children who were used as subjects were harmed as a consequence. These studies remain morally troubling, however, for several reasons. First, although parents or guardians were asked for their permission to have their children involved in the research, the available evidence suggests that the information provided was, at best, incomplete. Second, there is the question of the fairness of selecting institutionalized children at all, children whose life circumstances were by any standard already heavily burdened.

It has been claimed that the highest dose of radiation that any subject was exposed to was 330 millirem, the equivalent of less than one year's background radiation in Denver. A 1995 class-action suit resulted in a 1998 District court decision awarding the victims a $1.85 million settlement from MIT and Quaker.

The school also participated in studies of thyroid function in patients with Down syndrome and their parents. This study showed that their iodine metabolism was similar to normal controls.

=== Reform lawsuit ===
This situation changed in the 1970s, when a class action suit, Ricci v. Okin, was filed to upgrade conditions at Fernald and several other state institutions for persons with intellectual disability in Massachusetts. U.S. District Court Judge Joseph Louis Tauro, who assumed oversight of the case in 1972, formally disengaged from the case in 1993, declaring that improvements in the care and conditions at the facilities had made them "second to none anywhere in the world". A result for Fernald residents of the class action suit which took effect in 1993 was the provision of "a guaranteed level of care, regardless of cost, to compensate for decades of neglect and abuse".

=== Twenty-first century ===
The buildings and grounds survived into the 2000s as a center for mentally disabled adults, operated by the Massachusetts Department of Mental Retardation. In 2001, 320 adults resided at Fernald, with ages ranging from 27 to 96 years and an average age of 47 years. According to a December 13, 2004 article in the Boston Globe, Massachusetts Governor Mitt Romney announced in 2003 that the facility would be closed and the land sold by 2007. In 2003, a coalition of family advocates and state employee unions began a campaign to save Fernald and asked Judge Tauro to resume his oversight of the "Ricci v. Okin" class action lawsuit that had led to improvements at Fernald and the other state facilities beginning in the 1970s.

In an August 14, 2007 ruling, Judge Tauro ordered the Department of Mental Retardation to consider the individual wishes of all 185 institution residents before closing the facility. However, in September 2007, the new administration of Governor Deval Patrick appealed Tauro's ruling to the First Circuit U.S. Court of Appeals in Boston. In a statement, the Patrick administration contended that Fernald had become too expensive to continue to operate and that equal or better care could be provided in private, community-based settings for the remaining Fernald residents. The administration's cost claims have been disputed by the Fernald League for the Retarded, Inc., the Massachusetts Coalition of Families and Advocates for the Retarded, Inc. (COFAR) and other family-based organizations, which have continued to advocate for the preservation of Fernald as a site for ICF/MR-level care for its current residents. Those advocacy organizations proposed a "postage-stamp" plan under which Fernald would be scaled back in size and the remaining portion of the campus sold for development. The Patrick administration, however, declined to negotiate with those Fernald advocates, and pressed ahead with its appeal and closure plans.

A significant portion of the Waltham campus, encompassing its facilities established through Fernald's tenure, was listed on the National Register of Historic Places in 1994. Fernald was the subject of a 2005 documentary film "Front Wards, Back Wards" directed by W.C. Rogers, which has been shown on some PBS television stations.

As of June 2013, Fernald remained open with 13 residents living on grounds, the oldest of whom was 84 years old and a resident since the age of 19. It was reported to cost approximately US$1,000,000 per client per year, or about four times the United States national average for a state-supported institution.

The Fernald Center's last resident was discharged on Thursday, November 13, 2014, after a protracted legal and political battle which cost the Commonwealth of Massachusetts over $40 million in additional costs over the projected closure date of 2010. Remaining residents were integrated into community services or other state-operated programs. In 2014 the land was purchased by the city of Waltham in two parcels, 139 acres for $2.7 million paid out of Community Preservation Act funds, and 40 acres for $800,000 of city funds. The CPA section may only be used for open space, recreation, or historic preservation. The 40 acre portion has no restrictions for future use. There was a period of discussion about building a new high school for Waltham on a section of the site, but eventually the proposal was discarded due to difficult topography, potential soil contamination, and a denial of approval from the Massachusetts Historical Commission related to the demolition of certain buildings on the site.

== Current status ==
In May 2017 and 2018, the Waltham Lions Club held a fundraising carnival on the grounds with rides, games, prizes, a petting zoo and food.

In November/December 2020 and 2021, the site became the home of the Greater Boston Lights Show, a fundraiser for the Waltham Lions Club chapter. The decision to host a holiday lights display at this location angered disability rights advocates.

In December 2021, the Waltham Recreation Department held an online meeting to collect public input for potential recreational development on the Fernald property. While many suggestions were made around walking paths, gardens, and other passive recreation facilities, the majority of the meeting focused on the need to honor and respect the history of Fernald and the treatment of the residents.

In 2022, an "amusement park" was approved by the City Council for the Fernald, complete with an electric train, mini golf, open green space, tennis and pickleball courts, a massive athletic complex, eight parking lots, an amphitheater, and a universal playground for children with disabilities. At a Waltham City Council meeting in December 2023, members approved a $9.5 million loan authorization for the project. As of early 2024 construction on the project has begun with no completion date announced. Many residents have opposed the plan for its lack of transparency and for its perceived offensiveness to the disabled community.

In January 2024, Oliver Egger, a journalist and great-great-grandson of Walter Fernald, wrote an investigative piece in The Boston Globe describing how, despite knowledge by the City of Waltham and the state, thousands of confidential patient records were left on the campus after its closure. This was in violation of HIPAA. Soon after the article's publication, the state removed the documents from the campus and admitted wrong-doing. The Civil Rights Division of the Department of Health and Human Services has formally launched an investigation. In April 2024, The Globe reported that in addition the Massachusetts State Police left decades’ worth of confidential case files at the school for years, removing them in 2017.

On April 19th, 2025, a four alarm fire at the abandoned site was extinguished by firefighters, less than a year after another fire at the same location. This raised suspicions of possible arson, prompting Massachusetts officials to release a press statement offering a reward to any witnesses.

== See also ==
- Human experimentation in the United States
- Templeton Developmental Center, another state facility originally established under Fernald's tenure
- National Register of Historic Places listings in Waltham, Massachusetts
- Metropolitan State Hospital (Massachusetts), the state hospital located across the street at 475 Trapelo Road
- Wrentham State School, Massachusetts' last remaining large scale institution for developmentally disabled people
- Belchertown State School, a similar state institution that existed from 1922 to 1992 and was built to alleviate overcrowding at Wrentham and Fernald.
