= New Covenant Church of Cambridge =

Church in Waltham, Massachusetts

Coordinates: 42.3773°N 71.2319°W

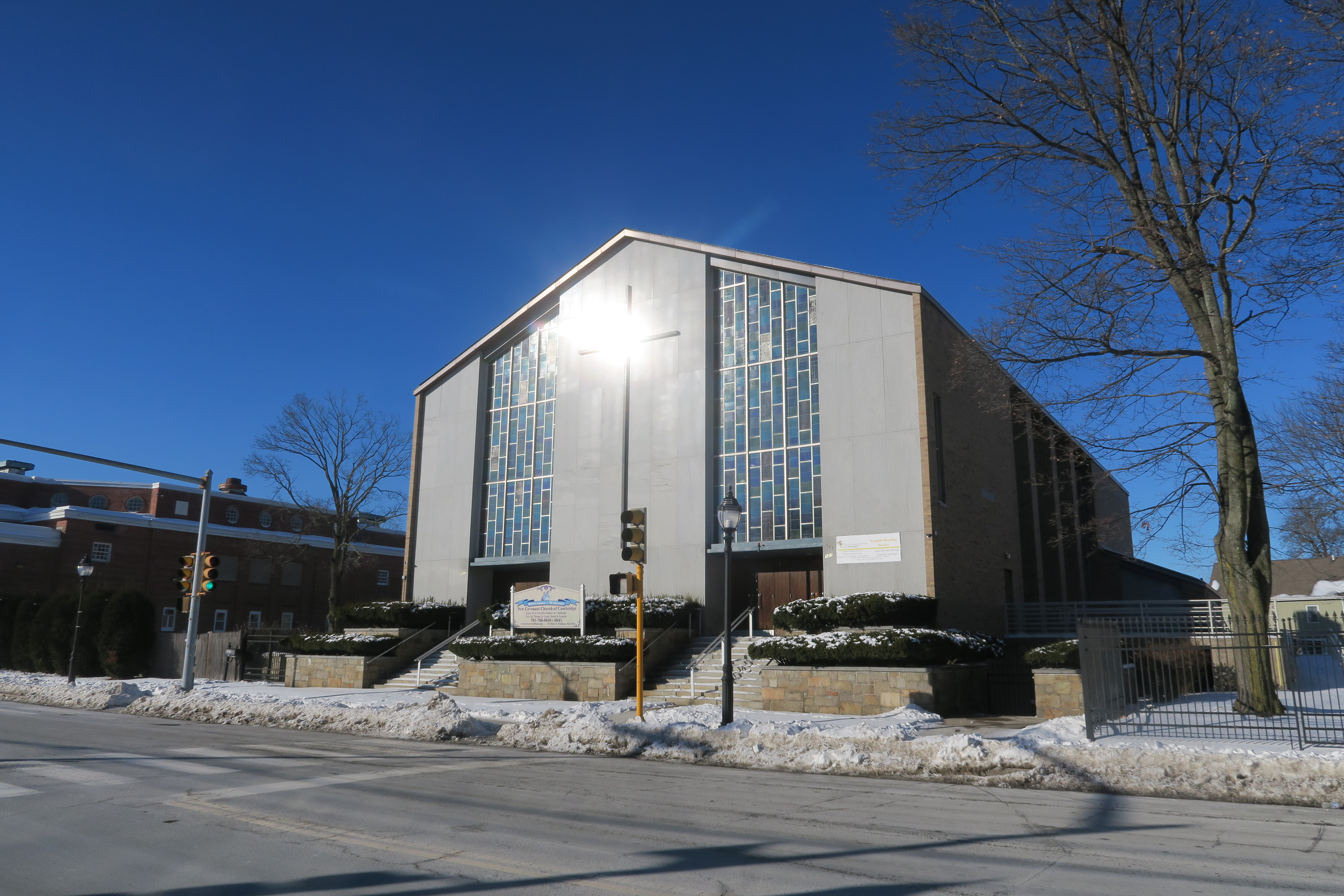
New Covenant Church of Cambridge

New Covenant Church of Cambridge is located in Waltham, Massachusetts. It is a Haitian church and is headed by the Reverend Esther and the Reverend Thomas St. Louis.

== History ==
The Protestant congregation began in 1984 as a gathering of the extended St. Louis family in a living room. As Haitian immigrants and native-born Americans increased its numbers, the church rotated services among members' houses, schools, auditoriums, and outside venues.

In 1990, the congregation bought a former woodworking shop in North Cambridge and converted it into a church. After seven years the congregation had outgrown the building and searched for larger premises. After several failed bids at different sites, they successfully purchased St. Joseph Roman Catholic church, convent, and adjacent buildings in Waltham; one of 44 church buildings closed in a reorganisation of the Boston Roman Catholic Archdiocese that started in 2004.

The main church building accommodates 1000 worshipers, whilst the adjacent smaller hall has room for 300. Services are mainly given in Haitian Creole, with English services provided once a month.
