= Global Partners =

American energy supply company

Global Partners LP
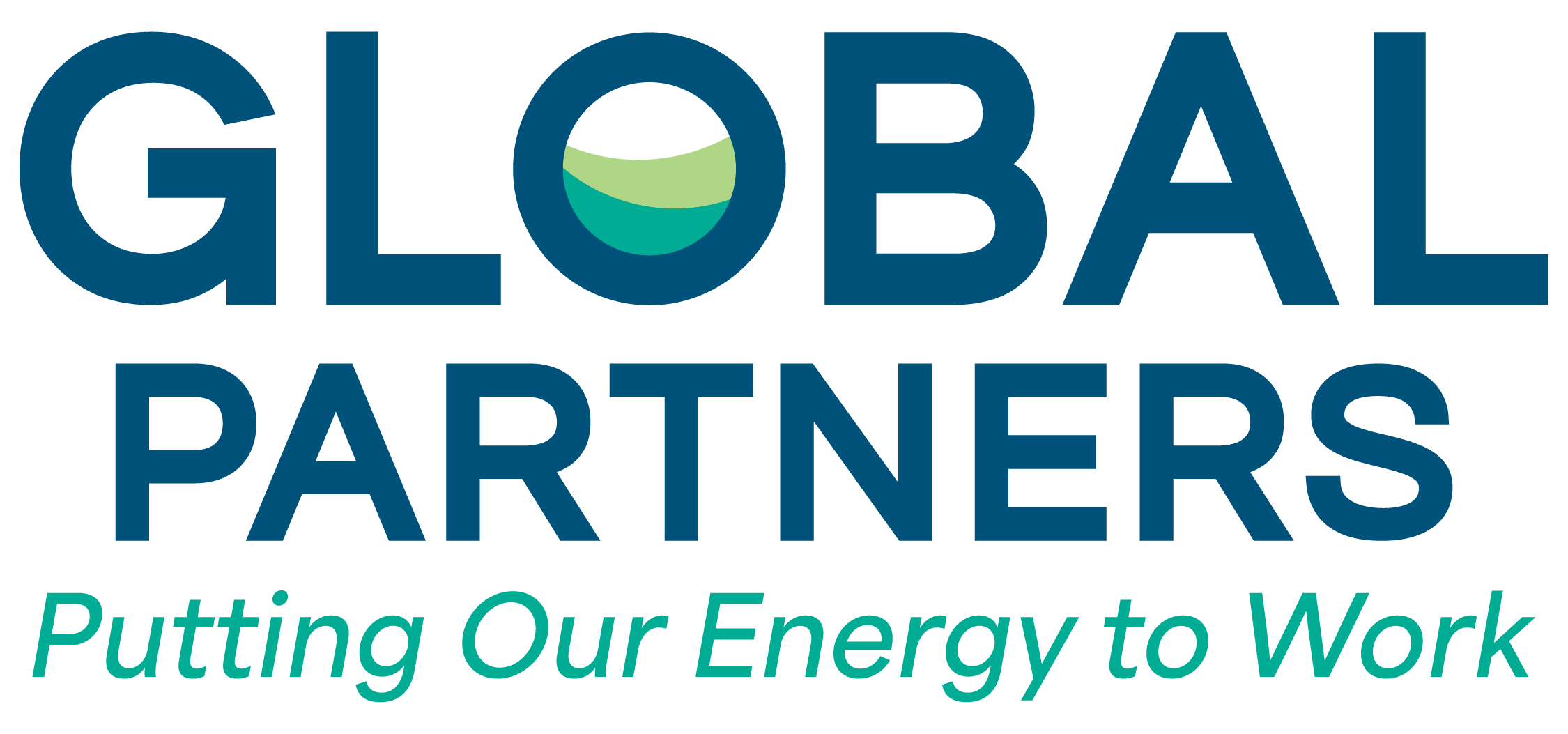
- Industry: energy supply company
- Founded: 1933
- Headquarters: Waltham, Massachusetts
- Key people: Richard Slifka (Chairman); Eric Slifka (CEO); Mark Romaine (COO)
- Revenue: $16.49 billion (2023)
- Number of employees: 5,060 (2023)
- Website: globalp.com

Global Partners LP (NYSE: GLP) is an American energy supply company ranked 361 in the 2018 Fortune 500. The company is organized as a master limited partnership, and its operations focus on the importing of petroleum products and marketing them in North America. It wholesales products like crude oil, diesel oil, gasoline, heating oil and kerosene.

== History ==
Global was founded in 1933 as a single truck heating oil distributor. Since then, it has grown through the acquisitions of gasoline stations, convenience stores, pipelines, and storage terminals.

March 2012 - Global Partners acquired Alliance Energy, another company owned by the Slifka family that operated gas stations in the Northeast.

October 2012 - Global Partners announced that it was buying a majority stake in two trans-loading facilities in North Dakota for a fee of around $80 million, expanding its presence in the Bakken region.

January 2015 - Global Partners expanded by acquiring the parent of Xtra Mart convenience stores in a $387-million deal.

December 2023 - Global Partners paid $305.8 million to acquire 25 liquid energy terminals from Motiva. At the time, the acquisition almost doubled Global’s operating footprint in the south and southeast US.

April 2024 - Global Partners announced it had acquired four liquid energy terminals in Massachusetts, Connecticut and New Jersey from Gulf Oil Limited Partnership for $212.3 million.
