= Metropolitan State Hospital (Massachusetts) =

Historic district in Massachusetts, United States

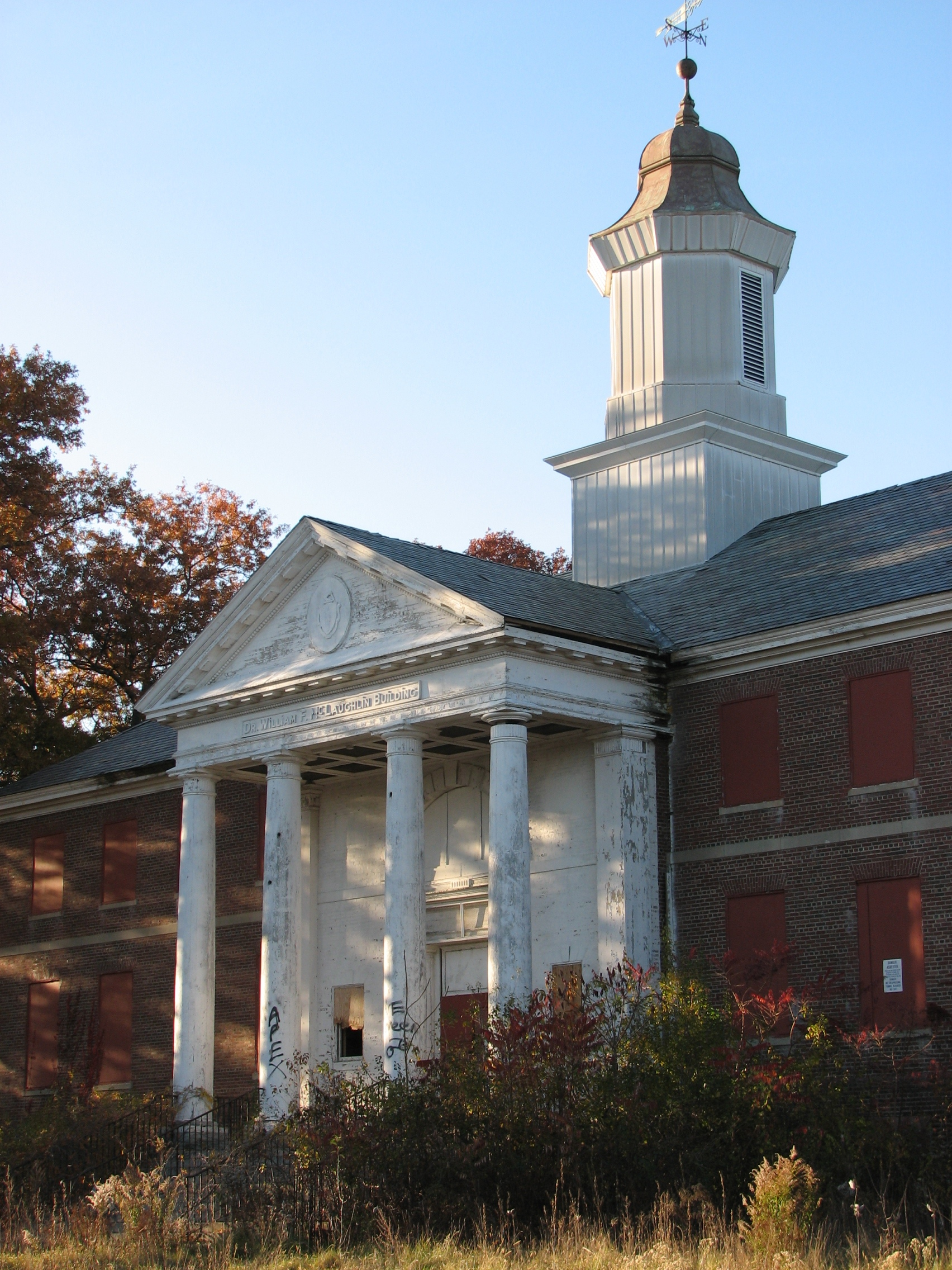
- Administration Building

Geography
- Location: Massachusetts, United States

Organization
- Type: Specialist

Services
- Speciality: Psychiatric hospital

History
- Opened: 1927
- Closed: 1992

Links
- Lists: Hospitals in Massachusetts
- Metropolitan State Hospital
- U.S. National Register of Historic Places
- U.S. Historic district
- Location within Massachusetts Location within the United States
- Location: Off Trapelo Rd., Belmont, Lexington, and Waltham, Massachusetts
- Coordinates: 42°24′20″N 71°12′49″W
- Area: 330 acres (130 ha)
- Built: 1927
- Architect: Gordon C. Robb
- Architectural style: Colonial Revival
- MPS: Massachusetts State Hospitals and State Schools MPS
- NRHP reference No.: 93001482
- Added to NRHP: January 21, 1994

The Metropolitan State Hospital was a public hospital for the mentally ill, on grounds that extended across parts of Waltham, Lexington, and Belmont in Massachusetts, US. Founded in 1927, it was at one time the largest and most modern facility of its type in Massachusetts. It was closed in January 1992 as a result of the state's cost-cutting policy of closing its mental hospitals and moving patients into private and community-based settings. The main complex of buildings has subsequently been redeveloped into apartments. The hospital campus was listed on the National Register of Historic Places 1994. The property also housed the Gaebler Children's Center for mentally ill youth.

== History ==
The Metropolitan State Hospital's founding originated in legislation passed by the state in 1900, mandating that the state take over care for the mentally ill, which had in some cases only been handled at the local level. Site selection for a facility in the Greater Boston area, where the demand for additional space was the greatest, took until 1926. Ground was broken on the hospital buildings in 1926, and the facility was formally dedicated in 1928, and opened on October 29, 1930. Construction continued until 1935, with some stages under Works Progress Administration supervision. The complex cost $1.8 million and was considered the most modern mental health facility in the country.

The hospital's design was reflective of the third stage of development of facilities for the mentally ill, after the Kirkbride Plan and the cottage/colony system. It also reflected the advent of roads rather than railroads as major transport arteries, as it was not located near any railroad lines. Its buildings were designed in the Colonial Revival style by Gordon Robb, with landscaping, based on principles laid down by the Olmsted Brothers, by R. Hayward Loring. At its peak, the facility had a patient population of nearly 2,000. The grounds included the Met-Fern cemetery, a burial site it shared with the Fernald School.

In 1978, Metropolitan State patient Anne Marie Davee was murdered by another patient, Melvin W. Wilson.

The facility was closed in 1992 during a deinstitutionalization movement when most state mental hospitals in Massachusetts shut down and patients were placed in smaller group settings. The property was unused until redevelopment began in 2007.

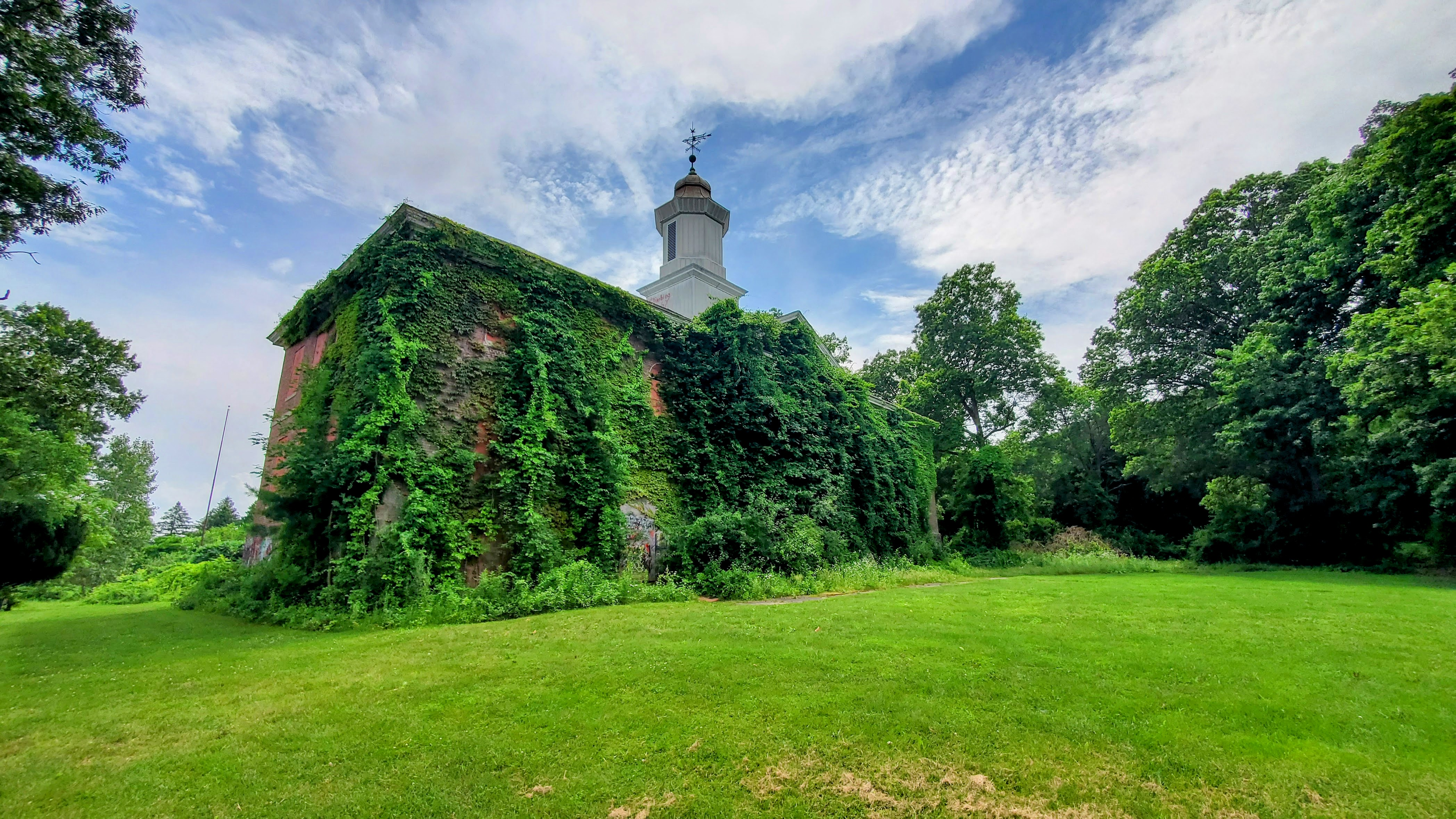
Metropolitan State Hospital in 2023

== Redevelopment and open space ==
In 2007, some of the complex's residential wards located in the Lexington portion of the property were adaptively repurposed for conventional residential use as part of larger apartment complex development known as Avalon at Lexington Hills. The Administration Building, pictured above, stands in Waltham. A number of the former hospital buildings were incorporated into the new development including the former Kline Hall which now houses marketing offices, Lexington's cable access station, an auditorium and a fitness area. A large concrete relief from the medical-surgical building has been installed outside the building as a memorial to the state hospital. The extensive wooded grounds are open to the public and protected in perpetuity from further development. The trails include part of the Western Greenway open space, connecting to the Rock Meadow conservation area in Belmont to the east and, according to plans, in 2009, to the Middlesex County Hospital area to the west.

== See also ==
- National Register of Historic Places listings in Waltham, Massachusetts
- National Register of Historic Places listings in Lexington, Massachusetts
- National Register of Historic Places listings in Middlesex County, Massachusetts
