= Waltham Symphony Orchestra =

The Waltham Symphony Orchestra (WSO) is an American Civic Symphony Orchestra based in Waltham, Massachusetts.

== Origin ==
It was created in December 2007 by a group of local individuals who wanted to see a professional-level symphony orchestra serving Waltham, a historical city of 60,000. Patrick Botti, who had been connected with the city of Waltham for many years, became the first music director of the orchestra after a brief tenure as the conductor of the Waltham Philharmonic Orchestra, a community orchestra in the city.

On May 18, 2008, the Boston Globe published a story titled "Classic choice", about the creation of the WSO and the sustenance of two symphony orchestras within the same city.

The orchestra had its inaugural concert on May 10, 2008, at the Kennedy Middle School Auditorium in Waltham, with a program featuring works by Mozart ("Così fan tutte Overture"), Daniel-Lesur ("Nocturne for Oboe and orchestra"), D'Indy ("Fantaisie on French popular Themes"), Ravel ("Mother Goose Suite") and Brahms ("Symphony No 3 in F Major, Op. 90"). The soloist was the WSO principal oboist, Amy Dinsmore.

== Composition ==
The orchestra is composed of professional, semi-professional, amateur and student musicians drawn from Waltham and surrounding communities. The WSO's main performing venue is the Kennedy Middle School Auditorium, a 500 seat facility.

== Mission ==
As with other symphony orchestras in the United States, the WSO works closely with the local school system, universities and other local organizations to fulfill its mission. The WSO and Bentley University have been collaborating on projects where students help the orchestra develop strategies for marketing, audience development and Web 2.0 initiatives. The WSO has been developing a "music in the school" program, offering scholarships for Waltham students who cannot afford music lessons, and also creating outreach programs.

The WSO and the Waltham Schools are collaborating in bringing to the Waltham Elementary Schools a morning classical program created in 1989 by the New Bedford (MA) Symphony Orchestra, "Music in the Mornings", exposing elementary and middle school students to a daily dose of classical music.
