= Waltham Land Trust =

Coordinates: 42°23′4.7″N 71°12′49.9″W

The Waltham Land Trust is a private, non-profit corporation that seeks to preserve open space in Waltham, Massachusetts. The trust currently sponsors many projects, including the protection of the grounds of the former Gaebler Children's Center.
