= Robert Treat Paine Estate =

Historic house in Massachusetts, United States

- Robert Treat Paine Jr. House
- U.S. National Register of Historic Places
- U.S. National Historic Landmark
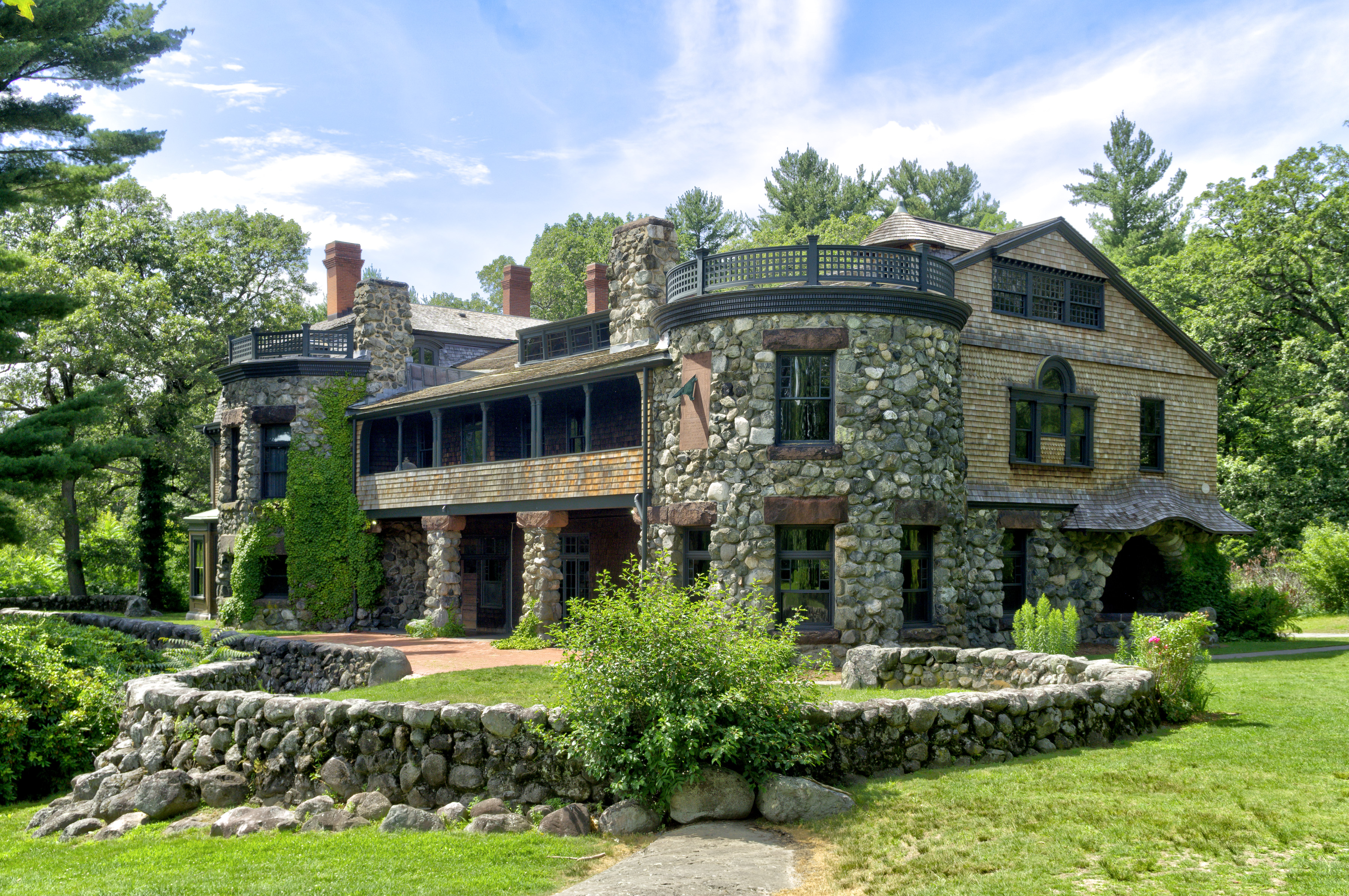

- Location within Massachusetts Location within the United States
- Location: Waltham, Massachusetts
- Coordinates: 42°23′16.61″N 71°13′53.21″W
- Area: 113 acres (46 ha)
- Built: 1866, 1883–1886
- Architect: Henry Hobson Richardson; Frederick Law Olmsted
- Architectural style: Shingle Style
- Website: Stonehurst
- NRHP reference No.: 75000291

Significant dates
- Added to NRHP: October 7, 1975
- Designated NHL: October 7, 1975

The Robert Treat Paine Estate, known as Stonehurst, is a country house set on 109 acres (44 ha) in Waltham, Massachusetts. It was designed for philanthropist Robert Treat Paine (1835–1910) in a collaboration between architect Henry Hobson Richardson and landscape architect Frederick Law Olmsted. It is located at 100 Robert Treat Paine Drive. Since 1974 the estate has been owned by the City of Waltham and its grounds kept as a public park, and is believed to be the only residential collaboration by Richardson and Olmsted that is open to the public.

== History ==
In 1866, Boston lawyer Robert Treat Paine Jr. and his wife Lydia (Lyman) commissioned architect Gridley James Fox Bryant to build a mansarded Second Empire summer house in Waltham. The house and its site were paid for by George Lyman, Lydia's father and owner of an adjacent summer residence, the Lyman Estate.

This house was deemed too small for the Paines and their seven children. In October 1883, Richardson and Olmsted made their first visit to the property to discuss relocating the house and expanding it. In July 1884, Olmsted and Richardson produced sketches for a new site atop a rocky ridge with sweeping views to the southeast. In the spring of 1885, construction began while the Paine family traveled to Europe with Phillips Brooks, a family friend and pastor of Trinity Church in Boston. When Richardson died at age 47 in April 1886, the commission was close to completion. The terrace and some interior finishes were completed over the summer.

Robert Treat Paine Jr. died in 1910, and the Paine family continued to occupy the house until the mid-1960s. In 1974 Theodore Lyman Storer donated the 113-acre (46 ha) property to the city of Waltham. The building was in bad shape, lacking the necessary maintenance, until public funds were injected in its renovation. The building became available to rent for events in 1986. The organization The Friends of Stonehurst (or Robert Treat Paine Historical Trust) was created in 1991 to advise the City of Waltham on the management of the estate.

Episode #2104 of This Old House featured a tour of the estate.

In 2018, the City Council announced its plan to cut thirteen acres of the estate's forest to build a new high school. By the mid-2020s, the cost of maintaining the building for the city became a public concern ($267,000 annual budget for a $50,000 profit), but a privatization proposal was refused by the City Council.

== Description ==
The house contains a massive wooden staircase decorated with hand carved balusters. The living-room boasts 1,750 square foot of living area. Many bookcases and nooks are used to fill the rooms.

== Gallery ==
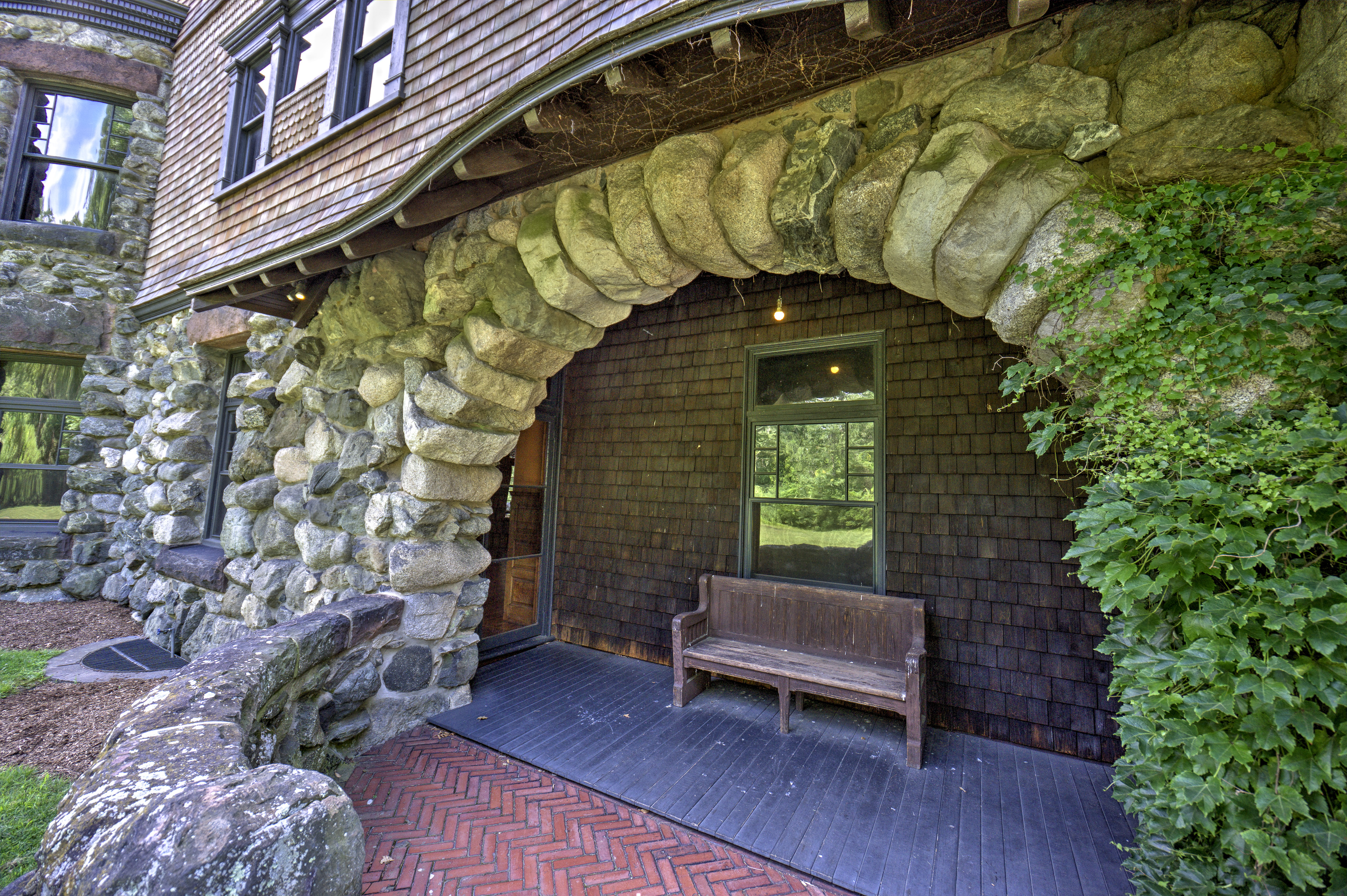
Sitting area

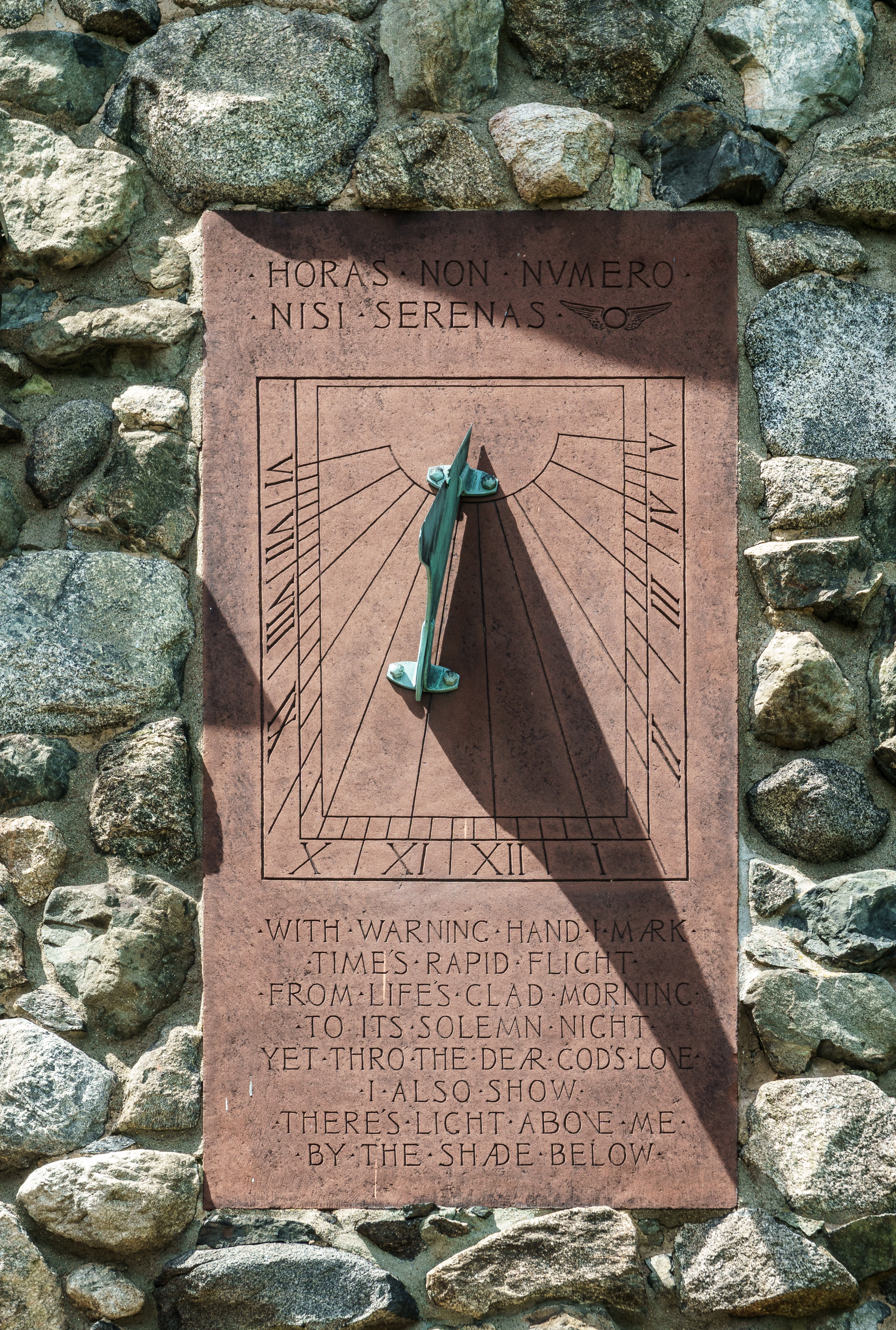
Sundial

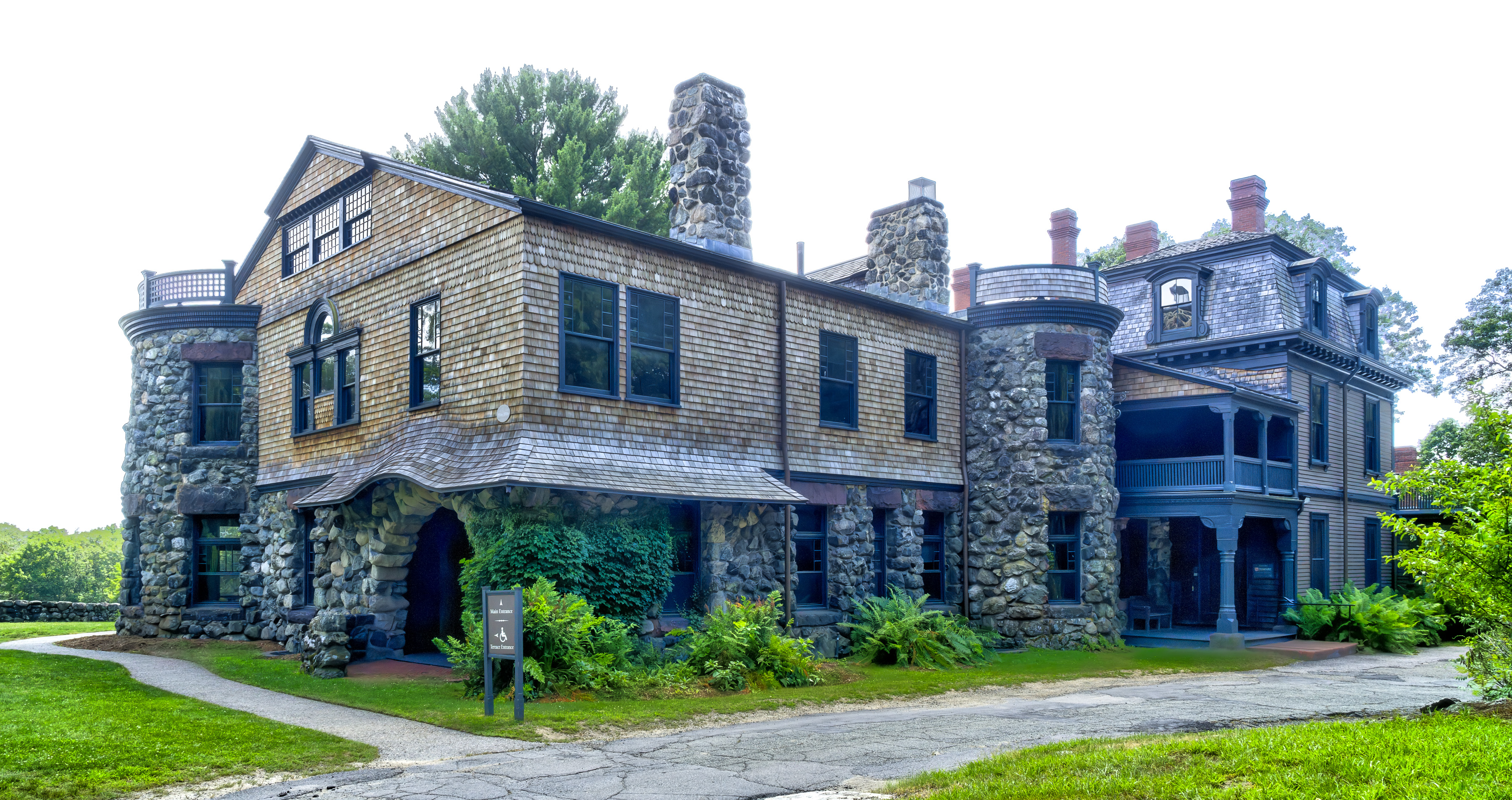
Northeast façade

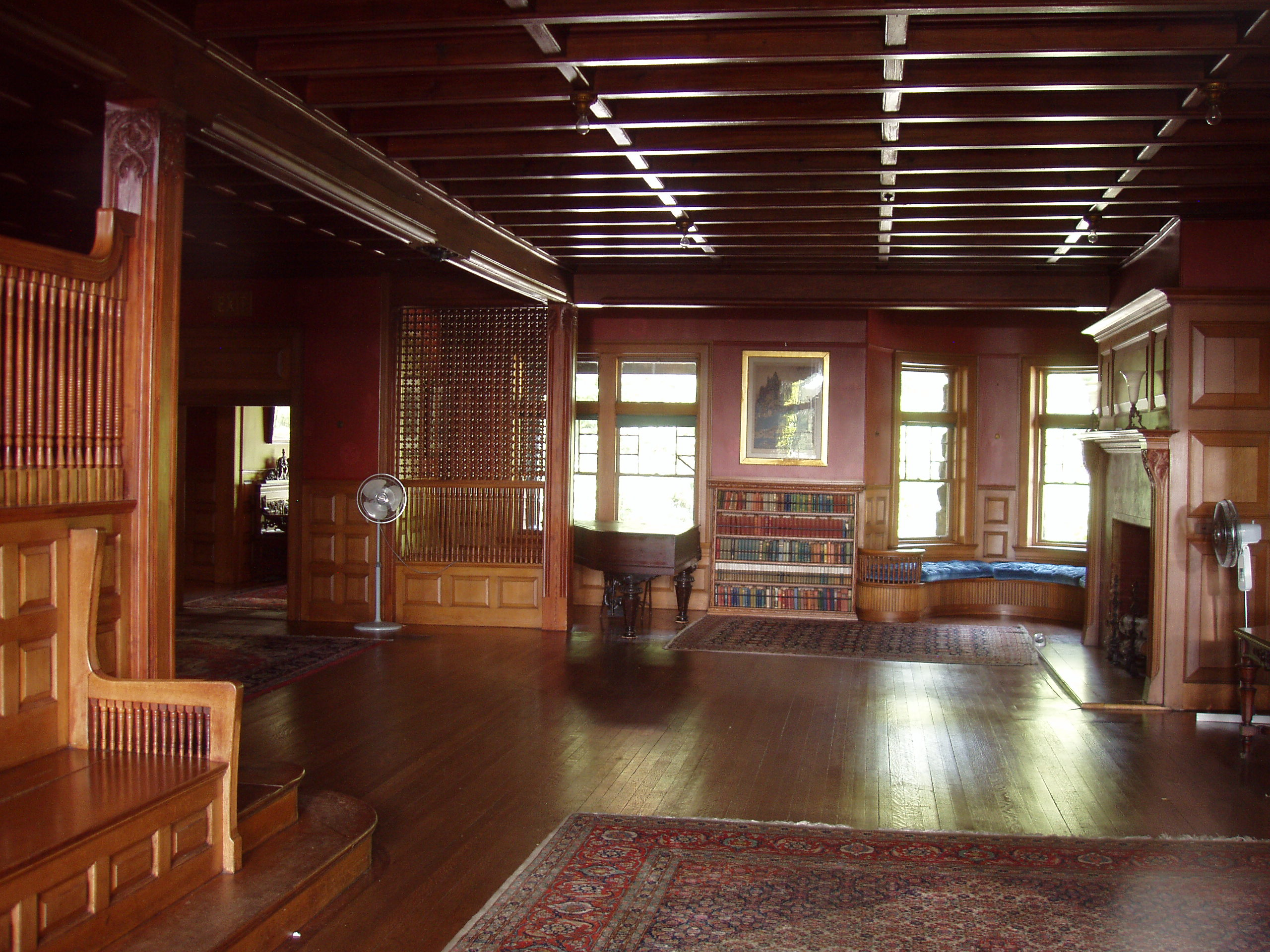
The Great Hall

== See also ==
- List of National Historic Landmarks in Massachusetts
- National Register of Historic Places listings in Waltham, Massachusetts

== Bibliography ==
- Margaret Henderson Floyd, "H. H. Richardson, Frederick Law Olmsted, and the House for Robert Treat Paine", Winterthur Portfolio, Vol. 18, No. 4 (Winter, 1983), pp. 227–248.
- Ann Clifford and Thomas M. Paine. Stonehurst, The Robert Treat Paine Estate: An American Masterwork by H.H. Richardson and F.L. Olmsted. Waltham, Massachusetts: Robert Treat Paine Historical Trust, 2007.
