= Charles River Museum of Industry & Innovation =

Museum in Waltham, Massachusetts, U.S.

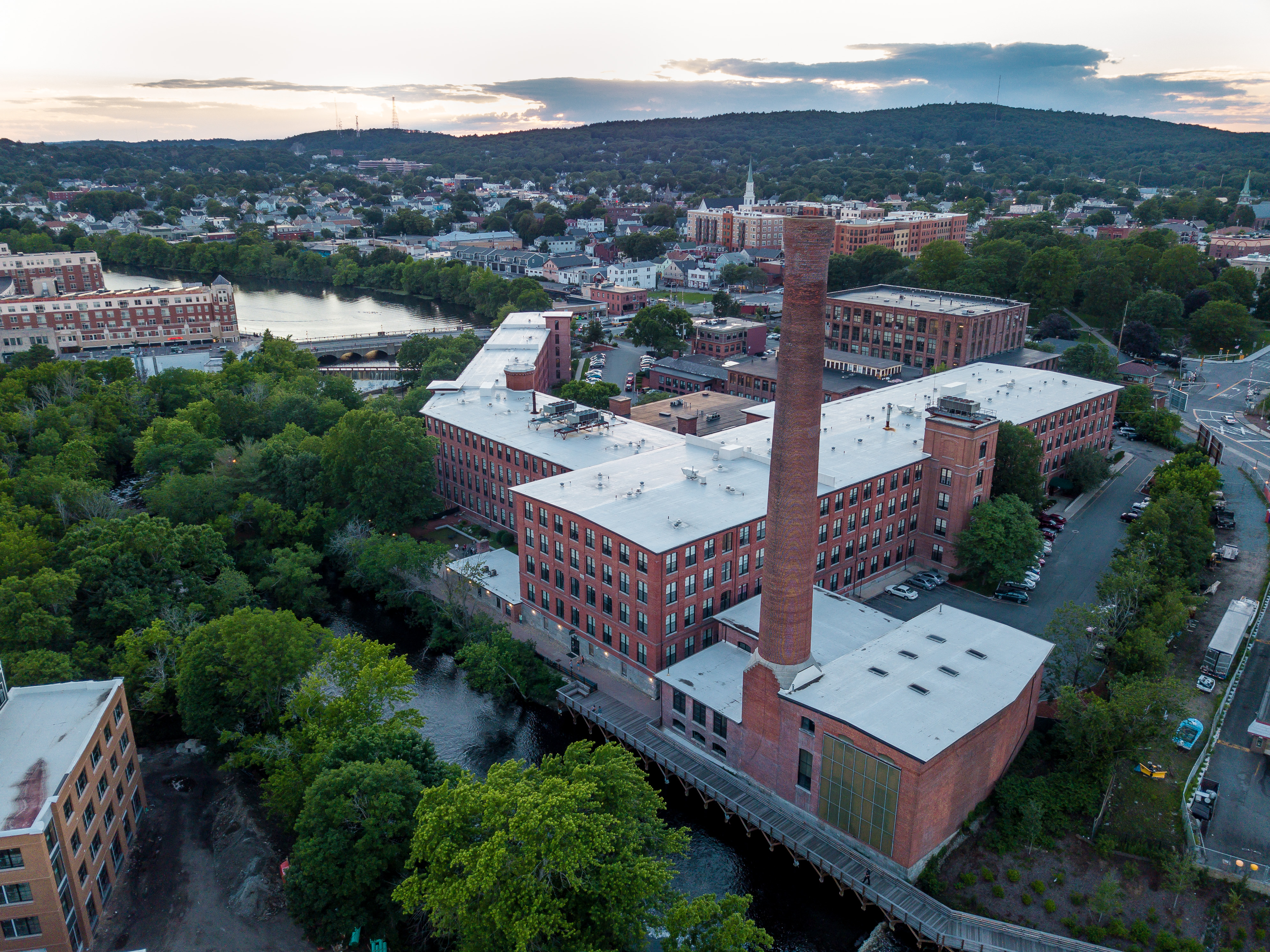
- Aerial view of the museum in June 2017
- Established: 1980
- Location: Waltham, Massachusetts
- Coordinates: 42.372824°N 71.234172°W
- Executive director: Bob Perry
- Public transit access: MBTA Commuter Rail and MBTA bus at Waltham station
- Website: charlesrivermuseum.org

Charles River Museum of Industry & Innovation is a museum of the American Industrial Revolution located on the Charles River Bike Path, near the intersection of the Charles River and Moody Street in Waltham, Massachusetts. It houses and displays machinery and artifacts of the industrial revolution from the nineteenth and twentieth centuries. The building was originally built as part of the Boston Manufacturing Company, Francis Cabot Lowell's seminal, fully integrated textile mill. The museum, which was incorporated in 1980 and opened to the public in 1988, takes up only a small portion of the previous mill building complex.

== History ==
The site is listed on the National Register of Historic Places as America's first fully integrated factory. The earliest buildings on the site have been designated a National Historic Landmark. Though many mills existed before the Boston Manufacturing Company, Francis Cabot Lowell's mill was the first to combine all steps of cotton fabric manufacturing under one roof.

Waltham received a $10 million urban revitalization grant, which allowed the site to be renovated and preserved. As part of the site's renovation, a group of cultural, civic, and business leaders led by Michael Folsom, an MIT professor, created the Charles River Museum of Industry & Innovation in what had been the mill's massive steam-powered engine and boiler rooms. Following a monumental campaign of fundraising, cleaning, building, planning, and installation, the museum began operation in 1980.

The museum is a nonprofit corporation governed by a Board of Trustees, and funded by private donations.

The mission of the Charles River Museum of Industry & Innovation is to encourage and inspire future innovation in America. The museum accomplishes this through its collections and programs, by exploring the historical impact of industry on American culture, by examining the dynamic process of innovation, by promoting its location in Waltham as a foundation of the American industrial revolution, by connecting the expertise of older generations with the inquisitiveness of young people, and by providing audiences of all ages with an engaging museum experience.

As of May 2025, the museum’s executive director is Bob Perry.

== Collection ==
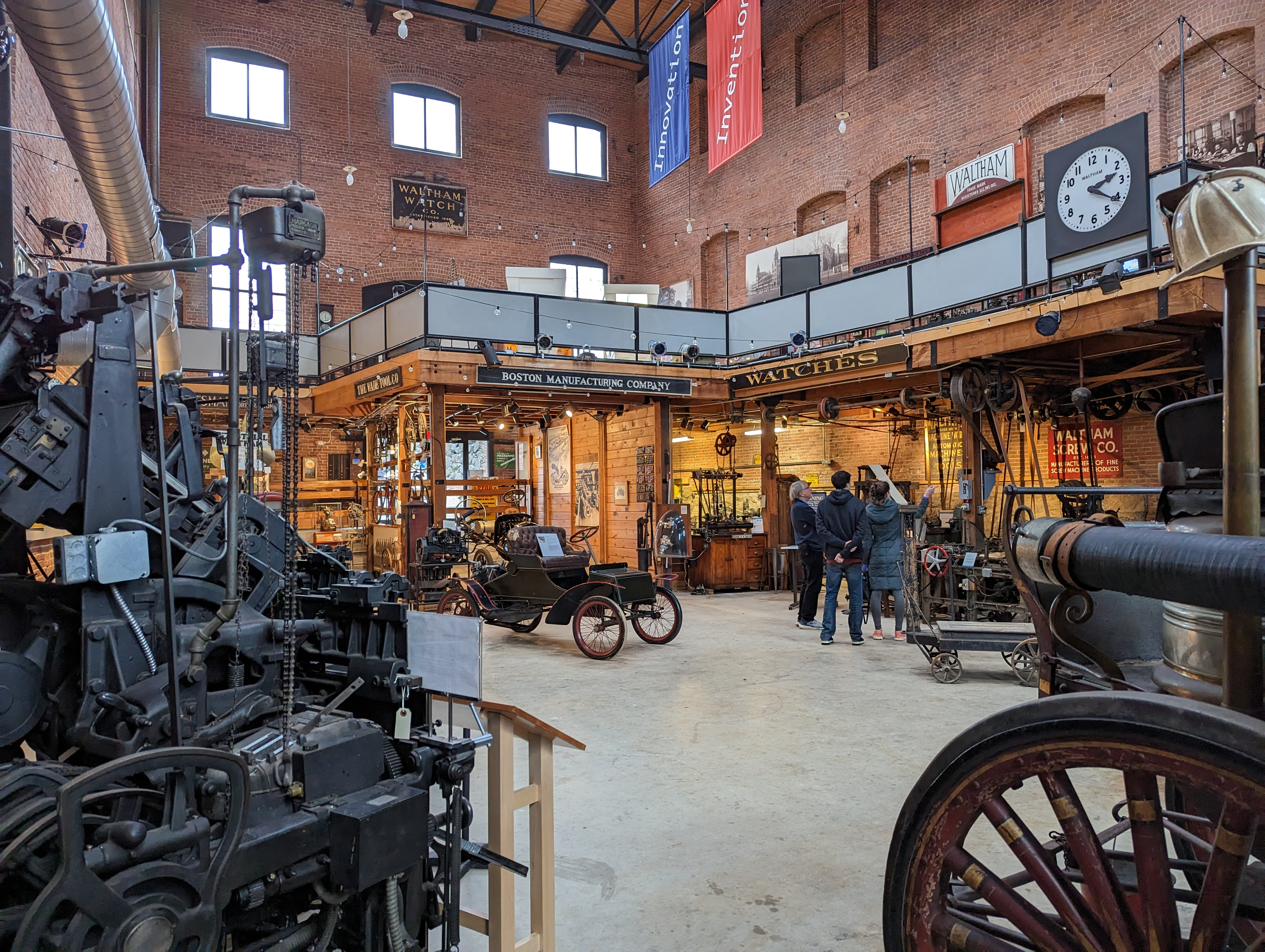
Museum interior; Waltham Watch gallery is on mezzanine.

Core exhibits cover the area's role in the American Industrial Revolution, though the museum also has a dedicated gallery of the Waltham Watch Company to note the city's watch making history. The museum includes two revolving exhibit spaces that change out anywhere from 3–6 months, covering anything from science and math to cultural investigation. The museum also hosts many events and festivals in the Waltham area, and was the first to host the Watch City Steampunk Festival, which was the first steampunk festival to encompass an entire town. The Boston Globe in 2014 reported the museum "takes exploratory learning a step further."
