= Waltham, Massachusetts =

City in Massachusetts, United States

- City
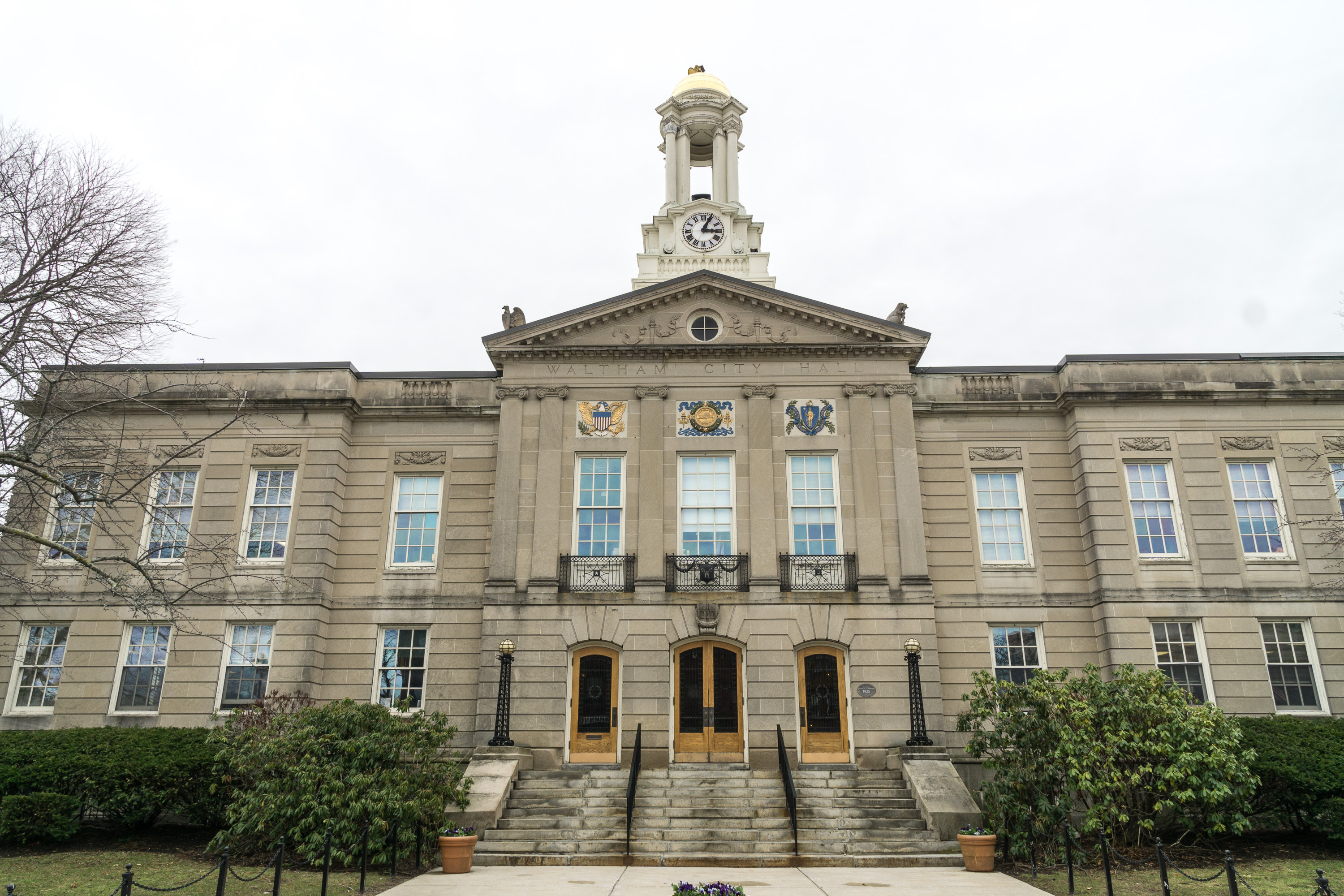
- Waltham City Hall in 2017

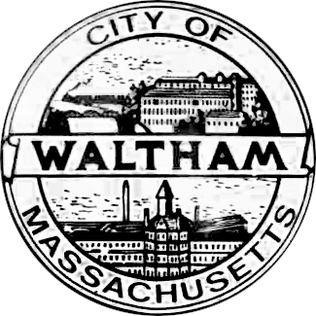
- Seal
- Nickname: The Watch City
- Location in Middlesex County in Massachusetts

- Location within Greater Boston area Location within Massachusetts Location within the United States
- Coordinates: 42°22′35″N 71°14′10″W
- Country: United States
- State: Massachusetts
- County: Middlesex
- Region: New England
- Settled: 1634
- Incorporated as a Town: 1738
- Incorporated as a City: 1884
- Named for: Waltham Abbey, Essex, England

Government
  - Type: Mayor-council city
  - Mayor: Jeannette A. McCarthy

Area
  - Total: 13.76 sq mi (35.64 km^{2})
  - Land: 12.75 sq mi (33.01 km^{2})
  - Water: 1.02 sq mi (2.63 km^{2})
- Elevation: 49 ft (15 m)

Population (2020)
  - Total: 65,218
  - Density: 5,117.8/sq mi (1,975.99/km^{2})
- Time zone: UTC−5 (Eastern)
  - Summer (DST): UTC−4 (Eastern)
- ZIP Codes: 02451–02454
- Area code: 339/781
- FIPS code: 25-72600
- GNIS feature ID: 0612400
- Website: city.waltham.ma.us

Waltham (/ˈwɔːlθæm/ WAWL-tham) is a city in Middlesex County, Massachusetts, United States, and was an early center for the labor movement as well as a major contributor to the American Industrial Revolution. The original home of the Boston Manufacturing Company, the city was a prototype for 19th century industrial city planning, spawning what became known as the Waltham-Lowell system of labor and production. The city is now a center for research and higher education as home to Brandeis University and Bentley University. The population was 65,218 at the 2020 United States census. Waltham is part of the Greater Boston area and lies 9 miles (14 km) west of Downtown Boston.

Waltham has been called "Watch City" because of its association with the watch industry. Waltham Watch Company opened its factory in Waltham in 1854 and was the first company to make watches on an assembly line. It won the gold medal in 1876 at the Philadelphia Centennial Exposition. The company produced over 35 million watches, clocks, and instruments before it closed in 1957.

Waltham borders Watertown and Belmont to the east, Lexington to the north, Lincoln and Weston to the west, and Newton to the south.

== History ==
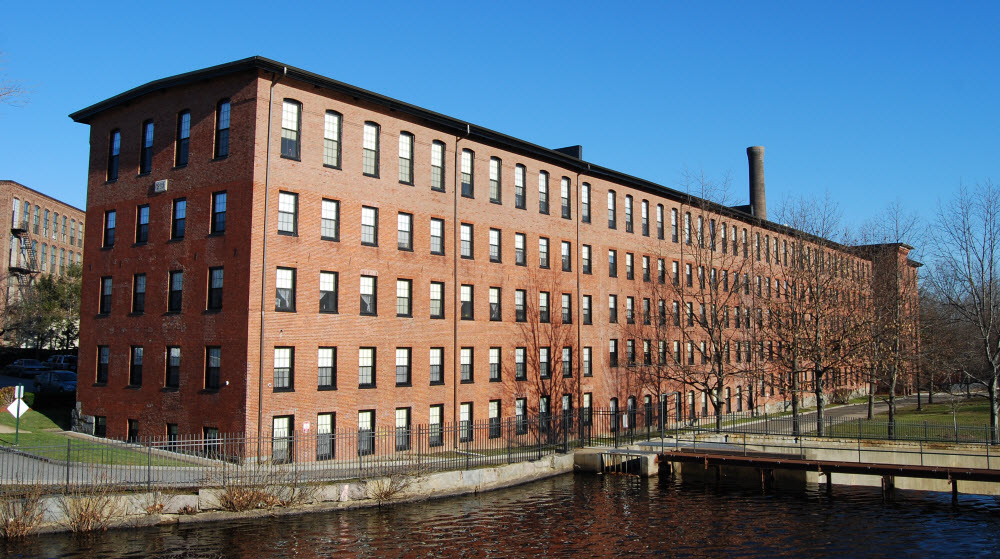
Boston Manufacturing Company

Waltham was first settled by the English in 1634 as part of Watertown, and was officially incorporated as a separate town in 1738, but the area was inhabited for thousands of years prior to English colonization. At the time of European arrival, Waltham was in a border zone between the territories of the Pawtucket confederation and the Massachusett, with nearby native settlements at Nonantum and Pequosset (Watertown). Early settlers recorded the presence of an "Indian Stockade" near today's Cambridge Reservoir, and an "Indian Hollow" in today's Calvary Cemetery. A native trail through Waltham, the "Old Connecticut Path" saw continued use after colonization and became the basis for present day Route 20.

Waltham is most likely named for Waltham Abbey in the County of Essex, England. The first record of the name is from the articles of incorporation, dated January 15, 1738. The name derives from the Anglo-Saxon words, weald or wald "forest" and ham "homestead" or "enclosure." Waltham had no recognizable town center until the 1830s, when the nearby Boston Manufacturing Company gave the town the land that now serves as its central square.

In the early 19th century, Francis Cabot Lowell and his friends and colleagues established in Waltham the Boston Manufacturing Company—the first integrated textile mill in the United States—with the goal of eliminating the problems of co-ordination, quality control, and shipping inherent in the subcontracting based textile industry. The Waltham–Lowell system of production derives its name from the city and the founder of the mill.

The city is home to a number of large estates, including Gore Place, a mansion built in 1806 for former Massachusetts governor Christopher Gore, the Robert Treat Paine Estate, a residence designed by architect Henry Hobson Richardson and landscape architect Frederick Law Olmsted for philanthropist Robert Treat Paine, Jr. (1810–1905), and the Lyman Estate, a 400-acre (1.6 km^{2}) estate built in 1793 by Boston merchant Theodore Lyman I.

In 1857, the Waltham Model 1857 watch was produced by the American Watch Company in the city of Waltham, Massachusetts. In the late 19th and early 20th century, Waltham was home to the brass era automobile manufacturer Metz, where the first production motorcycle in the U.S. was built.

Another first in Waltham industrial history involves the method to mass-produce the magnetron tube, invented by Percy Spencer at Raytheon. During World War II, the magnetron tube technology was applied to radar. Later, magnetron tubes were used as components in microwave ovens.

Waltham was also the home of the Walter E. Fernald State School, the western hemisphere's oldest publicly funded institution serving people with developmental disabilities. The storied and controversial history of the institution has long been covered by local and, at times, national media.

=== Timeline ===
Timeline of Waltham, Massachusetts
- 1703 – Grove Hill Cemetery established.
- 1738 – Town of Waltham incorporated from Watertown, Massachusetts.
- 1755 – Part of Cambridge annexed to Waltham.
- 1793 – The Vale (residence) built.
- 1810 – Waltham Cotton and Wool Factory Company formed.
- 1813 – Boston Manufacturing Company in business.
- 1820
  - First Congregational Church founded.
  - Manufacturers' Library active.
  - Waltham Bleachery built.
- 1827 – Rumford Institute organized.
- 1833 – The Hive newspaper begins publication.
- 1835 – Waltham Bank established.
- 1837 – Methodist Episcopal Church organized.
- 1849
  - Part of Newton annexed to Waltham.
  - Christ Episcopal Church built.
- 1851 – Tornado.
- 1852 – Baptist Church organized.
- 1853 – Waltham Gas Light Company incorporated.
- 1854 – American Horologe Company relocates to Waltham.
- 1856 – Waltham Sentinel newspaper begins publication.
- 1857
  - Waltham and Watertown Railroad constructed.
  - Mount Feake Cemetery established.
  - Waltham Agricultural Library Association formed.
- 1859 – Town of Belmont separates from Waltham.
- 1863 – Waltham Free Press begins publication.
- 1865 – Public Library founded.
- 1866 – Emmet Literary Association formed.
- 1870
  - Waltham Horological School established.
  - Waltham Foundry Co. established.
- 1876
  - Waltham Weekly Record begins publication.
  - Davis & Farnum Manufacturing Company in business.
- 1879 – Leland Home for aged women established.
- 1880 – Music Hall built.
- 1881 – Emery Wheel Company in business.
- 1882 – Parmenter Crayon Company chartered.
- 1884
  - City of Waltham incorporated.
  - Harrington Block built.
- 1885
  - Board of Trade organized.
  - Waltham Hospital founded.
  - Waltham Training School for Nurses established.
- 1886 – Robert Treat Paine Estate built.
- 1888 – Sesquicentennial.
- 1890
  - Population: 18,707.
  - Massachusetts School for the Feeble-Minded relocates to Waltham.
- 1891 – O'Hara Waltham Dial Company organized.
- 1893
  - Waltham Evening News begins publication.
  - Waltham Manufacturing Company established.
  - Beaver Brook Reservation and Charles River Reservation established.
- 1894
  - Linden Street Bridge constructed.
  - Waltham Bicycle Park opens.
- 1902 – Metz Company in business.
- 1908 – Company F State Armory built.
- 1910 – Population: 27,834.
- 1915 – Waltham Historical Society incorporated.
- 1924 – Waltham News Tribune newspaper in publication.
- 1928 – Middlesex College of Medicine and Surgery relocates to Waltham.
- 1933 – First Parish Church rebuilt.
- 1935 – Gore Place Society founded.
- 1936 – Hovey Players (theatre group) founded.
- 1938 – County Courthouse built.
- 1941 – Waltham Garden Club founded.
- 1948 – Brandeis University established.
- 1961 – Rose Art Museum founded at Brandeis University.
- 1968
  - Bentley University relocates to Waltham.
  - WBRS on air.
- 1970 – Population: 61,582.
- 1971
  - Waltham Museum established.
  - Robert Drinan becomes Massachusetts's 3rd congressional district representative.
- 1975 – Aerosmith musical group rents Wherehouse.
- 1976 – Waltham Mills Artists Association open studios begins (approximate date)
- 1980 – Charles River Museum of Industry established.
- 1982 – Parexel International Corporation headquartered in Waltham.
- 1985 – Waltham Philharmonic Orchestra formed.
- 1987 – Joseph P. Kennedy II becomes Massachusetts's 8th congressional district representative.
- 1988 – Global Petroleum Corporation headquartered in Waltham (approximate date).
- 1995 – Steinway Musical Instruments, Inc. headquartered in Waltham.
- 1996
  - Lionbridge Technologies Inc. headquartered in Waltham.
  - City website online.
- 1999 – Waltham Land Trust incorporated.
- 2003 – Raytheon Company and Roving Software Inc. headquartered in Waltham.
- 2004
  - Jeannette A. McCarthy becomes mayor.
  - Brandeis University's Schuster Institute for Investigative Journalism nonprofit established.
- 2006 – Thermo Fisher Scientific Inc. headquartered in Waltham.
- 2007
  - PerkinElmer, Inc. headquartered in Waltham.
  - Waltham Symphony Orchestra formed.
- 2010 – Population: 60,632.
- 2011
  - A triple homicide occurs on September 11.
  - Watch City Steampunk Festival begins.
- 2013 – Katherine Clark becomes Massachusetts's 5th congressional district representative.

=== Pronunciation ===
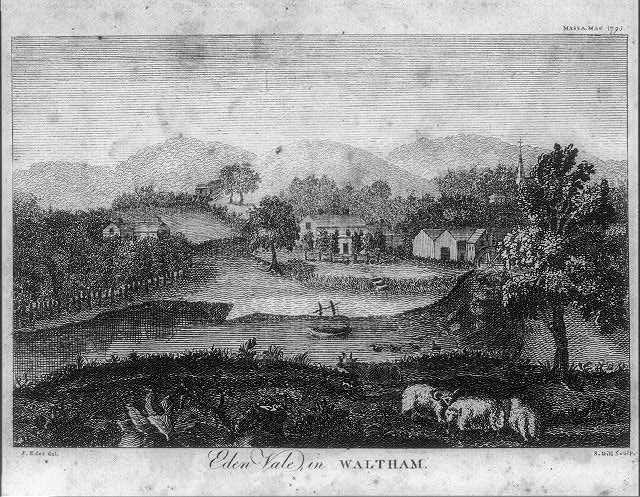
Waltham, 1793

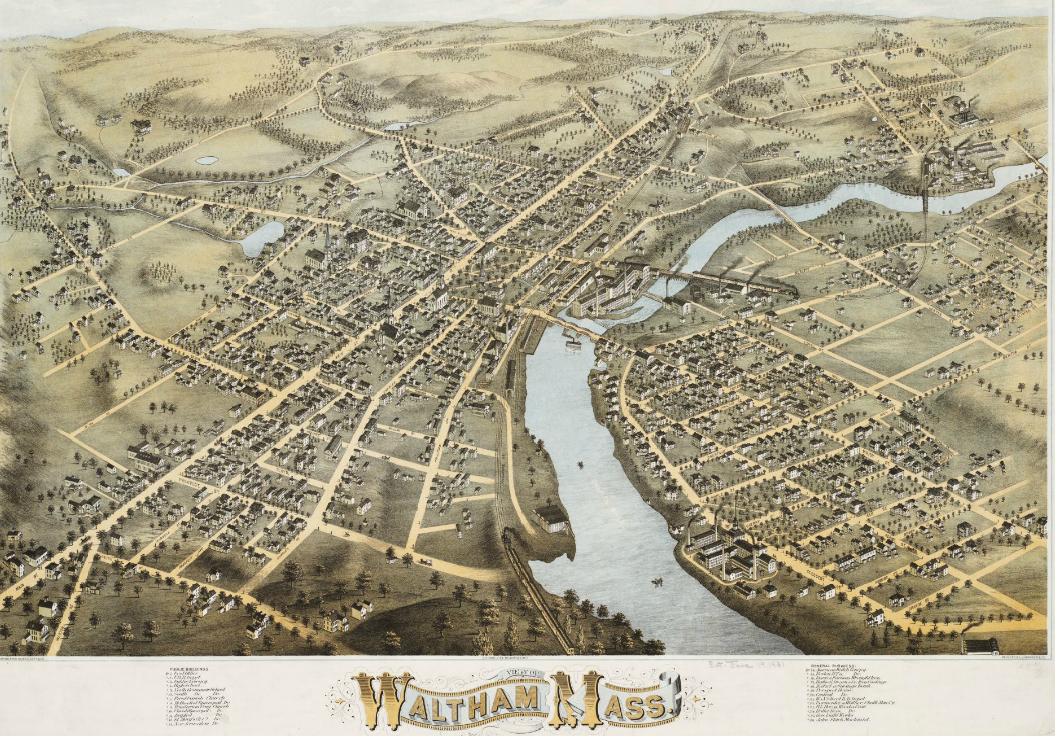
Map of Waltham, 1877

The name of the city is pronounced with the primary stress on the first syllable and a full vowel in the second syllable, /ˈwɔːlθæm/ WAWL-tham, though the name of the Waltham watch was pronounced with a reduced schwa in the second syllable: /ˈwɔːlθəm/. At one time, most people would have pronounced it in the British way, "Walthum", but when people came to work in the mills from Nova Scotia, the pronunciation evolved. The local version became a phonetic sounding to accommodate French speakers who could not pronounce it in the British way. In some areas, the city is referred to as "The Waltham".

== Geography ==
Waltham is located at 42°22′50″N 71°14′6″W (42.380596, −71.235005), about 11 miles (18 km) north-west of downtown Boston, Massachusetts, and approximately 3 miles (4.8 km) northwest of Boston's Brighton neighborhood. The heart of the city is Waltham Common, which is home to Waltham City Hall and various memorial statues. The Common is on Main Street, which is home to several churches, the Waltham Public Library, and Post Office.

The city stretches along the Charles River and contains several dams. The dams were used to power textile mills and other endeavors in the early years of the industrial activity.

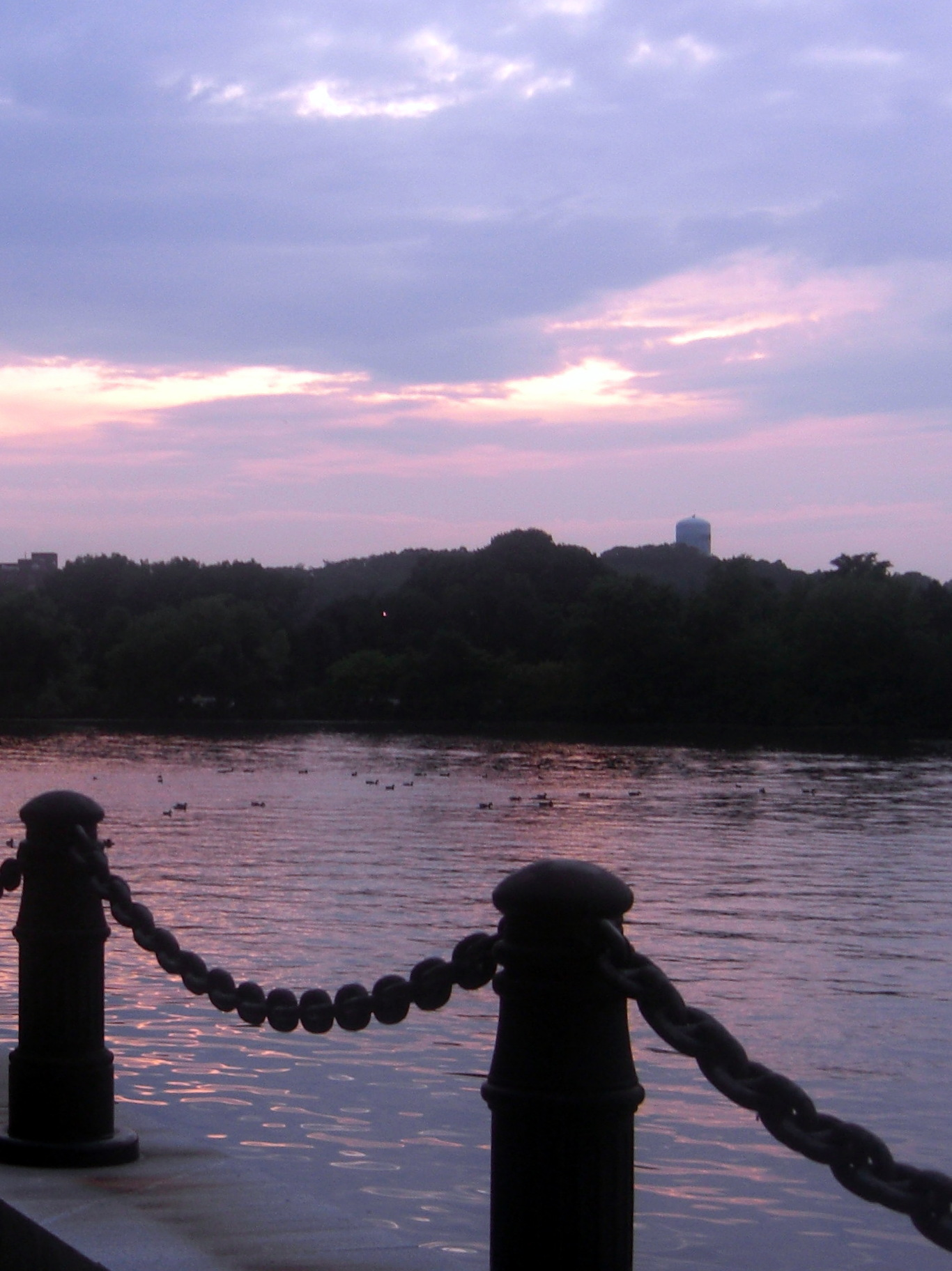
The Charles River in Waltham

According to the United States Census Bureau, the city has a total area of 13.6 square miles (35 km^{2}), of which 12.7 square miles (33 km^{2}) is land and 0.9 square miles (2.3 km^{2}) (6.69%) is water.

=== Neighborhoods ===
Waltham has several neighborhoods or villages, including:

- Angleside
- Banks Square
- The Bleachery (named after the former Waltham Bleachery and Dye Works)
- Cedarwood
- The Chemistry (named after the former Newton Chemical Company)
- Ellison Park
- Gardencrest
- Headyland
- The Highlands
- The Island (formerly Morse Meadow Island)
- Kendal Green (mostly in Weston)
- Kendall Park
- Lakeview
- The Lanes
- Northeast
- The North Side
- Piety Corner
- Prospectville (defunct in 1894, now under Cambridge Reservoir)
- Rangeley Acres
- Ravenswood
- Roberts
- Rock Alley
- The South Side
- Warrendale
- West End
- Wildwood Acres

=== Adjacent towns ===
It is bordered to the west by Weston and Lincoln, to the south by Newton, to the east by Belmont and Watertown, and to the north by Lexington.

== Demographics ==
Historical population
Year	Pop.	±%
1790	882	—
1800	903	+2.4%
1810	1,014	+12.3%
1820	1,677	+65.4%
1830	1,857	+10.7%
1840	2,504	+34.8%
1850	4,464	+78.3%
1860	6,397	+43.3%
1870	9,065	+41.7%
1880	11,712	+29.2%
1890	18,707	+59.7%
1900	23,481	+25.5%
1910	27,834	+18.5%
1920	30,915	+11.1%
1930	39,247	+27.0%
1940	40,020	+2.0%
1950	47,187	+17.9%
1960	55,413	+17.4%
1970	61,582	+11.1%
1980	58,200	−5.5%
1990	57,878	−0.6%
2000	59,226	+2.3%
2010	60,632	+2.4%
2020	65,218	+7.6%
2024*	65,849	+1.0%
* = population estimate. Source: United States census records and Population Estimates Program data. Source: U.S. Decennial Census

=== 2020 census ===
As of the 2020 census, Waltham had a population of 65,218. The median age was 34.5 years. 14.9% of residents were under the age of 18 and 14.6% of residents were 65 years of age or older. For every 100 females there were 98.3 males, and for every 100 females age 18 and over there were 97.0 males age 18 and over.

100.0% of residents lived in urban areas, while 0.0% lived in rural areas.

There were 25,129 households in Waltham, of which 22.5% had children under the age of 18 living in them. Of all households, 39.7% were married-couple households, 23.1% were households with a male householder and no spouse or partner present, and 29.2% were households with a female householder and no spouse or partner present. About 33.0% of all households were made up of individuals and 10.9% had someone living alone who was 65 years of age or older.

There were 26,545 housing units, of which 5.3% were vacant. The homeowner vacancy rate was 0.6% and the rental vacancy rate was 4.7%.

Racial composition as of the 2020 census
Race	Number	Percent
White	40,672	62.4%
Black or African American	4,556	7.0%
American Indian and Alaska Native	344	0.5%
Asian	7,947	12.2%
Native Hawaiian and Other Pacific Islander	21	0.0%
Some other race	6,936	10.6%
Two or more races	4,742	7.3%
Hispanic or Latino (of any race)	10,719	16.4%

=== 2021 estimates ===
According to 2021 census estimates, the racial makeup of the city was 60.5% White, 7.6% Black or African American, 0.5% Native American or Alaska Native, 11.8% Asian, 0.0% Pacific Islander, 5.3% from other races, and 4.3% from two or more races. Hispanic or Latino of any race were 22.3% of the population.

=== Income and poverty ===
The median income for a household was $95,851, and per capita was $44,977. In 2020, 9.2% of the population and 5% of families lived below the poverty line. 11.7% of those under 18 and 8.45% of those 65 and older lived below the poverty line.

=== Foreign-born residents ===
As of 2020, 26.6% of Waltham residents were born outside of the United States. Of foreign-born residents, 41.5% were born in Asia, 32.7% in Latin America, 11.9% in Europe, and 9.7% in Africa.

== Arts and culture ==
Waltham's combination of population (especially in central and south Waltham) parks, public transit, stores, and trails gives it 62 (out of 100) walkability ranking on walkscore.com.

Moody Street in downtown Waltham features numerous shops, restaurants, and bars. The street's active nightlife, convenient access to the commuter rail, and lower rents have attracted younger professionals to Waltham in growing numbers in the twenty-first century. Moody Street is sometimes locally referred to as "Restaurant Row" and has become a destination because of the number, variety and quality of its locally owned restaurants. The city of Waltham has a free "Tick Tock Trolley" on Thursday, Friday and Saturday evenings from 6pm–11pm for visitors that provides easy access to local municipal parking lots.

In 2020 and 2021, Waltham shut down a large portion of Moody Street to vehicular traffic from May 1 until October 31, a plan devised to allow the street's restaurants to host outdoor dining and storefronts during the COVID-19 pandemic. Restaurant owners were supportive of this decision, as it provided them the opportunity to offer more seating and increase their capacity for business, but the plan received a mixed reception from non-restaurant business owners, some of whom argued that the lack of automobile access would be harmful for their businesses.

The Rose Art Museum at Brandeis University is devoted to modern and contemporary art. The Rose holds a variety of exhibitions and programs, and collections are free and open to the public.

The city's history is also celebrated at a number of museums, monuments, and archives. The Charles River Museum of Industry & Innovation, the Waltham Watch Factory historic district, the Gore Estate, the Lyman Estate, and the Robert Treat Paine Estate are among the most well known of the 109 sites in the city on the National Register of Historical Sites. Many festivals are held at these sites each year, such as the annual sheep shearing festival at the Gore Estate. The National Archives and Records Administration Northeast regional branch is located in Waltham. The Waltham Public Library has extensive archives regarding the city's history. The Waltham Museum is devoted solely to the history of the city. Mark Gately is the only stakeholder left of the Waltham Museum.

Waltham is known for its embracing of literary arts. Local author Jessica Lucci has written a series of books about Waltham which can be found at the Waltham Museum, The Waltham Historical Society, and many other regional establishments devoted to promoting literary arts.

The Waltham Mills Artists Association is located in one of the former factories of the Boston Manufacturing Company. The WMAA Open Studios takes place each year on the first weekend of November. The 76 artists of the WMAA open their homes and studios to the public. Works of all media imaginable are demonstrated, displayed and discussed.

The Waltham Philharmonic Orchestra, a civic symphony of the MetroWest area, began in 1985 under the direction of local musicians David J. Tierney and Harold W. McSwain, Jr. With almost 60 professional, semi-professional, and amateur musicians, the orchestra's mission is to provide the Waltham community with the opportunity to perform in and attend classical concerts of the highest quality. WPO musicians come from Waltham as well as from Boston and surrounding communities. The ensemble includes players of a wide range of ages and professions.

There are five to six concerts throughout the season, including one that features the winner of the annual Youth Concerto Competition, which provides opportunities for young musicians to perform solo works with the WPO. Annual concerts have included summer Concerts on the Common and the December Holiday Pops.

Waltham is home to the Waltham Symphony Orchestra, a high-level semi-professional civic orchestra. The 55 piece orchestra performs five concerts each season at the Kennedy Middle-school Auditorium. Its music director is French-born American conductor, Patrick Botti. Open space in the city is protected by the Waltham Land Trust.

Waltham embraces its ethnic diversity in a number of festivals. The annual Latinos en Acción Festival celebrates the many Puerto Rican, Mexican, Peruvian, and Guatemalan residents. It is held by Latinos in Action, a local nonprofit group that helps the Latino population register to vote, understand the laws and find scholarships. The festival includes a parade, music, food, and a beauty pageant.

Waltham has in recent decades become a center for Ugandan culture, with an estimated 1500 Ugandans living in the city, leading some to call Waltham "Little Kampala". The Ugandan North American Association (UNAA) is headquartered in Waltham, along with St. Peter's Church of Uganda Boston. Wilberforce Kateregga, a Ugandan immigrant to Waltham has since established Waltham College Uganda in Seeta Nazigo, Uganda, a boarding school for over 300 orphans and children affected by AIDS. The school was named in honor of Kateregga's new home city.

=== Points of interest ===
- Gore Place
- Lyman Estate
- Robert Treat Paine Estate
- Charles River Museum of Industry & Innovation
- Prospect Hill – third-highest point in the region (after two of the Blue Hills)
- Charles River – Riverwalk on Moody St.
- A. Wherehouse
- Rose Art Museum
- Metropolitan State Hospital (Massachusetts)
- Norumbega Tower
- American Waltham Watch Company Historic District
- Mass Central Rail Trail—Wayside

== Economy ==
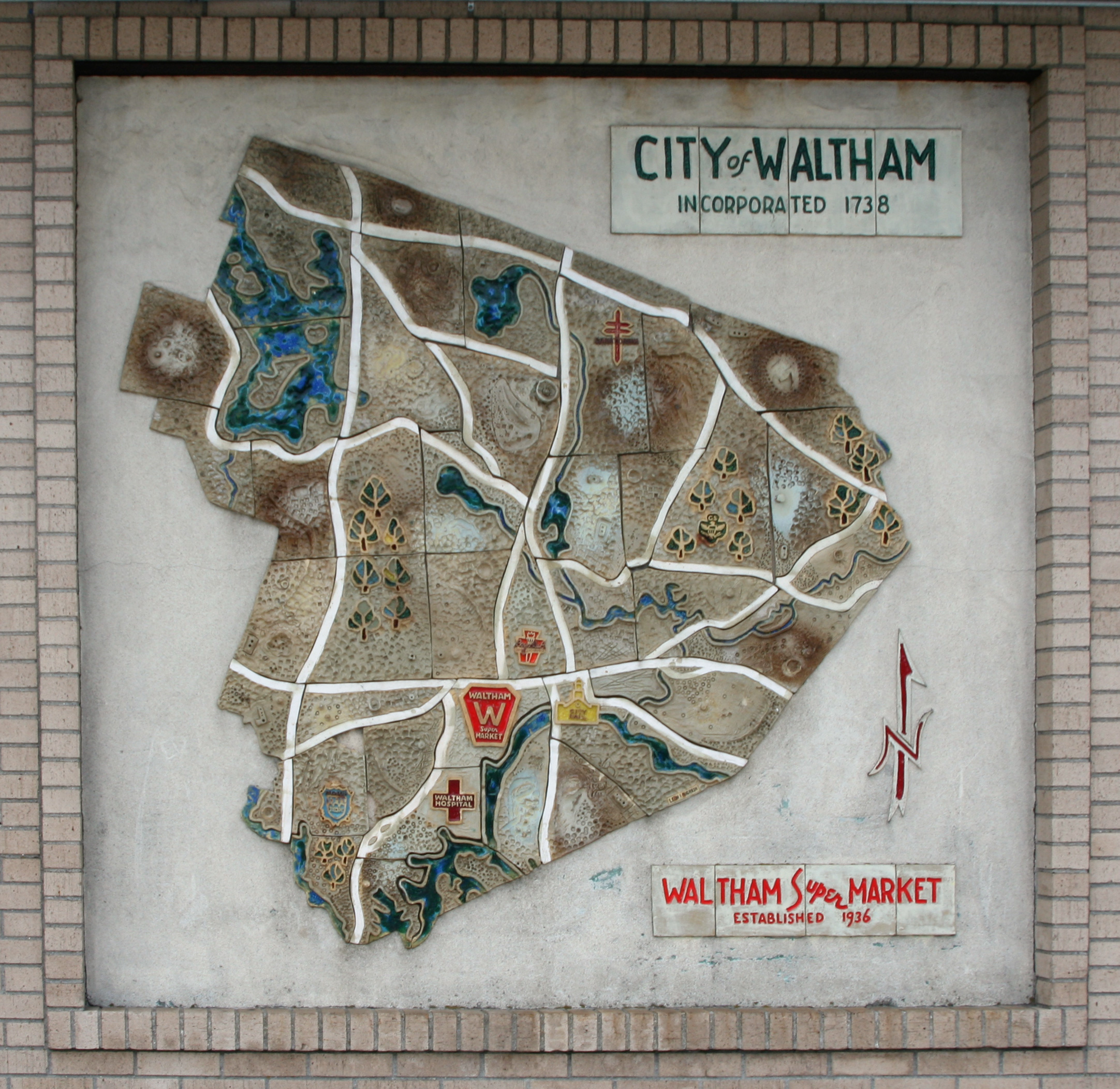
Waltham Supermarket on Main Street, established in 1936, was a large historic grocery store that closed in the 1990s. The building continues to be a supermarket, occupied subsequently by Shaw's, then Victory, and now Hannaford.

Among the major companies based in Waltham are the Life Sciences and Diagnostics firm Revvity (formerly the Life Sciences division of PerkinElmer), defense and aerospace corporation RTX Corporation (headquarters of its Raytheon business unit), biopharmaceutical services provider PAREXEL, energy supply company Global Partners, provider of scientific instrumentation Thermo Fisher Scientific, biopharma company Alkermes, and robotics engineering firm Boston Dynamics. Other companies with a major presence include data services provider Lionbridge, broker-dealer Commonwealth Financial Network, and technology companies Care.com and StudentUniverse, as well as the enterprise AI software firm Pegasystems (Pega).

The city is also a significant center for corporate headquarters and regional offices. Footwear manufacturer Wolverine World Wide, Inc. moved their regional headquarters from Lexington to the CityPoint campus in July 2016. C & J Clark America, Inc. moved their headquarters from Newton to the Polaroid site in October 2016. Retail activity is concentrated on Main Street, Moody Street, Lexington Street, River Street, parts of Route 60, and the First Avenue area. New retail development has also been active at a former Polaroid site.

=== Top employers ===
According to the city's 2023 Annual Comprehensive Financial Report (ACFR), the top ten non-city employers in the city are as follows.

Rank	Employer	Nature of Business	Number of Employees
1	Bentley University	Higher Education	1,000–4,999
2	Brandeis University	Higher Education	1,000–4,999
3	Fresenius Medical Care North America	Pharmaceuticals	1,000–4,999
4	National Grid	Utility	1,000–4,999
5	Constant Contact	Email Marketing	1,000–4,999
6	Vistaprint (Cimpress)	Print and Design Services	1,000–4,999
7	Eversource Energy	Utility	500–999
8	MetLife	Insurance	500–999
9	Sanofi Genzyme	Biotechnology/Pharmaceuticals	500–999
10	The GSA Group	Real Estate/Property Management	500–999
11	TJX Companies	Retail/Corporate Headquarters	500–999

== Education ==
=== Higher education ===
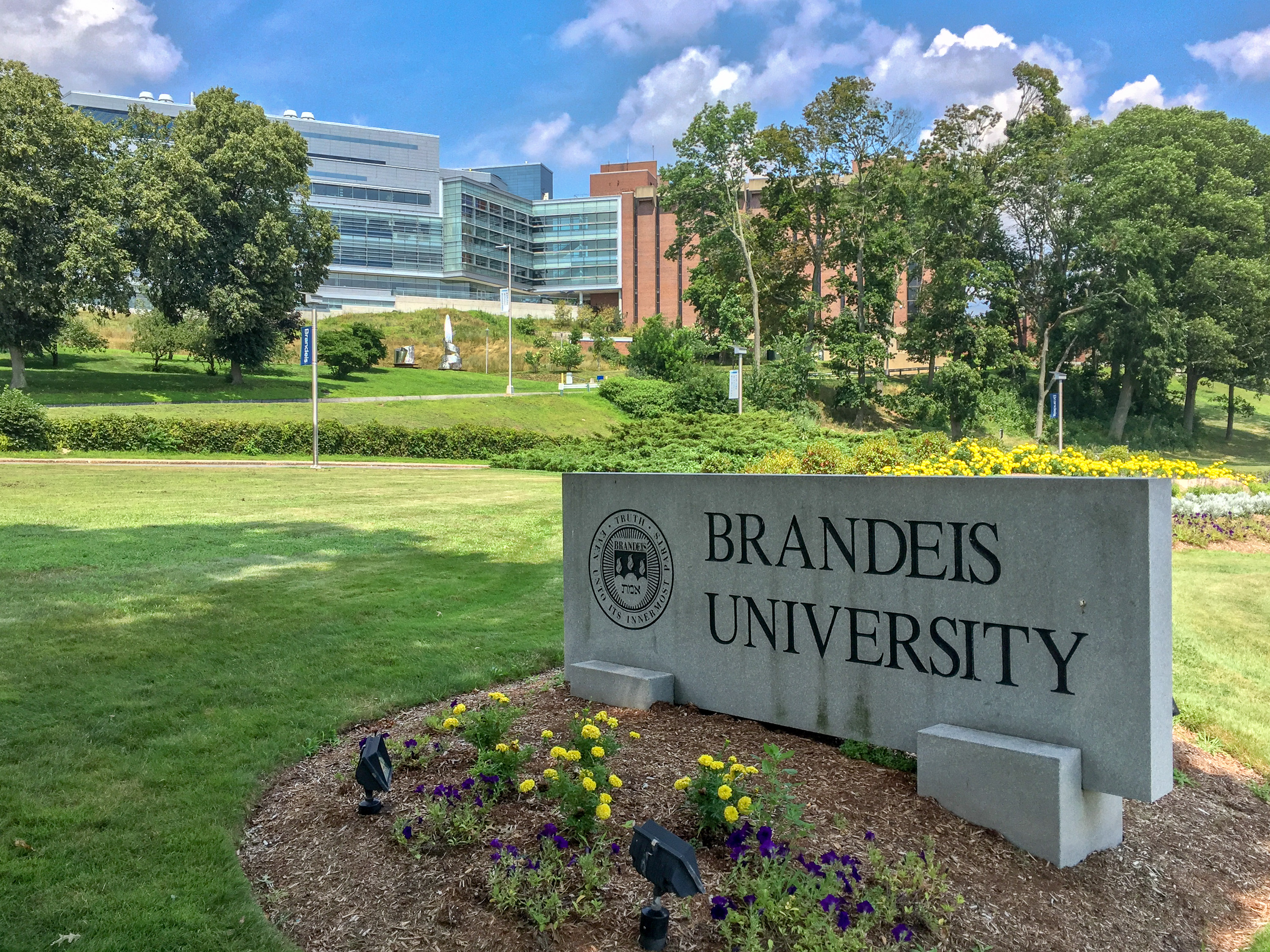
Brandeis University

Waltham is home to:

- Bentley University
- Brandeis University

=== Public schools ===
The Waltham Public Schools system includes seven elementary schools (Northeast, Fitzgerald, MacArthur, Plympton, Whittemore, Stanley, and the Waltham Dual Language Elementary School), two middle schools (McDevitt, Kennedy), and one senior high school (Waltham High School).

Waltham High School's sports teams had been referred to as the Watchmen and the Crimson, before they changed the name to the Hawks.

=== Private schools ===
- Chapel Hill – Chauncy Hall School
- Gann Academy – The New Jewish High School of Greater Boston
- Our Lady's Academy (formally Our Lady Comforter of the Afflicted School) (Pre-K through 8)
- Saint Jude School (Pre-K through 8) closed in 2019

== Government ==
Waltham is governed by a mayor and a city council. The current mayor is Jeannette A. McCarthy. There are 15 members of the city council, each elected to two-year terms in non-partisan elections. The current president of the city council is Robert G. Logan.

The city is in Massachusetts's 5th congressional district and is currently represented in the United States House of Representatives by Katherine Clark. Waltham is also represented in the Massachusetts House of Representatives by State Representative John J. Lawn and State Representative Thomas M. Stanley, and in the Massachusetts Senate by Senator Michael Barrett.

Voter Registration and Party Enrollment as of August 24, 2024
Party	Number of voters	Percentage
Democratic	10,557	34.45%
Republican	2,256	7.96%
Unaffiliated	23,873	56.98%
Libertarian	108	0.27%
Total	36,950	100%

=== Mayors of Waltham ===
- Jeannette A. McCarthy, 2004–
- David F. Gately, 1999–2003
- William F. Stanley, 1985–1999
- Arthur Clark, 1968–1984.
- Austin D. Rhodes 1959
- Paul V. Shaughnessy 1956–1958
- Henry A. Turner, 1953–1955
- Chauncey Cousens, 1949–1952
- John Devane, 1942–1948
- Arthur A. Hansen 1938–1942
- Frederick L. MacDonald 1937
- Henry W. Beal, 1922–1927
- George Raynolds Beal 1917–1922
- Eben J. Williams, 1915–1917
- Thomas K. Keans, 1913–1915
- Patrick J. Duane 1911–1913; 1930–1933
- Edward A. Walker, 1908–1911
- John L. Harvey, 1904–1908
- Murray D. Clement, 1902–1904
- Mahlon Leonard, 1901–1902
- George L. Mayberry 1898–1901
- Charles Bond 1897–1898
- Arthur Lyman 1896–1897
- Henry Milton 1895–1896
- Erskine Warden 1892–1895
- George L. Mayberry 1890–1891
- Henry N. Fisher 1887–1889
- Charles F. Stone 1886
- Byron B. Johnson (first mayor) 1884

== Infrastructure ==
=== Transportation ===
Waltham is close to several U.S. interstate highways. Interstate 95, multiplexed with Route 128, runs through the western part of the city. Interstate 90, which is also the Massachusetts Turnpike, is just to the south in Newton. Due to its proximity to the center of the Greater Boston metropolitan area, a number of state highways are within a few miles.

The MBTA commuter rail has two stops in Waltham as part of the Fitchburg-Boston Line: one in Central Square Waltham across from the City Hall and one near Brandeis University.

MBTA bus service also covers the city, including routes 61, 70, 170, 505, 553, 554, 556 and 558.

The Charles River runs through Waltham, and bike and walking paths cover most of the south bank, as well as part of the north bank from Prospect Street to Moody Street. Some commuters ride the path to offices in Cambridge and Boston.

=== Fire department ===
The city of Waltham is protected by the 166 full-time, paid firefighters of the city of Waltham Fire Department (WFD). Established in 1816, the Waltham Fire Department is currently organized into three divisions of operations: fire suppression, fire prevention, and training.

=== Emergency Medical Services ===
Armstrong Ambulance Service currently provides 24/7 Advanced Life Support emergency medical services to the City of Waltham.

== Media ==
=== Newspapers ===
Waltham is served by The Waltham Times, a digital nonprofit news outlet started in 2024. The news outlet is currently online-only as of 2026, but aspires to eventually publish a print edition.

Waltham was home to The Daily News Tribune, a daily newspaper, until 2010, when it was renamed and reduced to a weekly newspaper called the Waltham News Tribune by its owner, GateHouse Media (later Gannett). This new weekly newspaper was itself shut down in 2022.

The Waltham edition of Patch covers local news. In 2024, Patch employed one editor for the city, who was also in charge of covering three other towns and all of Cape Cod.

=== Television and radio ===
WCAC-TV is a community access television station based in the city. In addition, MAC-TV, which is owned by the same nonprofit corporation, provides coverage of the municipal government.

Waltham was formerly the home of classical radio station WCRB (99.5 FM), which relocated to the WGBH studios in Brighton in 2006. Brandeis University runs a low-power station, WBRS (100.1 FM).

== Notable people ==
- Luther Atwood, chemist in the oil industry
- Keith Aucoin, hockey forward for New York Islanders
- F. Lee Bailey, lawyer
- Nathaniel Prentice Banks, Union General in the Civil War, 24th Governor of Massachusetts, Speaker of the United States House of Representatives
- Anya Battaglino, professional hockey player in the National Women's Hockey League (NWHL)
- Mackenzy Bernadeau, guard for NFL's Dallas Cowboys
- Suzanne Brockmann, author
- Nellie Marie Burns (c. 1850–1897), actor and poet
- Annie Payson Call, author
- Rob Chiarelli, multiple Grammy Award winner
- JP Dellacamera, play-by-play commentator of Major League Soccer for ABC and ESPN
- Ryan Gallant, professional skateboarder
- Alan Griffin, professional basketball player for the Newfoundland Growlers of the Canadian Elite Basketball League
- James N. Hallock, scientist, known for his work on the Columbia Accident Investigation Board
- John Peabody Harrington, ethnologist and linguist
- Sophie Chantal Hart, professor at Wellesley College
- Lorenza Haynes (1820–1899), librarian, minister, school founder, suffragist, writer
- Clarence Hobart, six-time national doubles champion in tennis; born in Waltham
- Abbie Hoffman, born in Worcester, MA; author, radical political activist, founder of the Youth International Party
- C. D. Howe, WWII and postwar Canadian politician; Waltham native
- Gail Huff, television reporter for WCVB-TV, wife of Scott Brown, former U.S. Senator from Massachusetts
- Deena (Drossin) Kastor, Olympic bronze medal-winning marathon runner
- Pauline R. Kezer, Secretary of the State of Connecticut (1991–1995); born and raised in Waltham
- John Leary, Major League Baseball first baseman and catcher for the St. Louis Browns
- Jeff Lazaro, former Boston Bruins forward
- Samuel Livermore, United States Senator from New Hampshire
- Mel Lyman, musician, filmmaker, writer and founder of the Fort Hill Community
- John Lynch, Governor of New Hampshire
- Shawn McEachern, Boston Bruins forward
- Paul Moody, Inventor, developer of cotton loom; namesake of Moody St. in downtown Waltham
- Angelo Mosca, former Canadian Football League player and professional wrestler
- Richard Thomas Nolan, Episcopal Church Canon, writer, philosophy and religion professor, LGBT advocate
- Dave Pino, member of the band Powerman 5000
- Tom Rooney, racing driver
- Ida Annah Ryan, first woman to earn a master's degree in architecture (from M.I.T.)
- Evelyn Sears, U.S. Open tennis champion
- Fred Smerlas, NFL defensive lineman with Buffalo Bills, San Francisco 49ers, and New England Patriots
- Caroll Spinney, puppeteer; performed the roles of Big Bird and Oscar the Grouch on Sesame Street
- Ruth Dixon Turner (1914–2000), marine biologist
- Edward Royal Warren, naturalist and engineer
- Mary Watson Whitney, astronomer, Vassar professor of astronomy, Vassar observatory director
- Bob Weston, American bass guitarist and music producer, known for his work in the minimalist rock band Shellac
- Chris Wilson, guitarist for the Flaming Groovies and The Barracudas
- Gordon S. Wood, recipient of the 1993 Pulitzer Prize for History
- Franz Wright, Pulitzer Prize–winning poet
- Paramahansa Yogananda, author of Autobiography of a Yogi built his first ashram in America here

== See also ==
- New Covenant Church of Cambridge
- Norumbega
- List of mill towns in Massachusetts

== Sources ==
- Barry, Ephraim L. (1887). City of Waltham, Massachusetts.
- Eaton, Percival R. (May 1906). "Works of the Watch City". New England Magazine.
- Illustrated Boston: The Metropolis of New England (Second ed.). New York: American Publishing and Engraving Co. 1889.
- Proceedings at the Celebration of the Sesqui-centennial in the Town of Waltham, held in Music Hall, on Monday, January 16th, 1888. Waltham: Ephraim L. Barry. 1893.
- "Waltham" . Encyclopædia Britannica (11th ed.). 1910.
