= List of defunct Massachusetts State Mental Facilities =

This is a list of defunct state mental hospitals and schools in Massachusetts:

== State hospitals ==
- Boston State Hospital - demolished; now mixed-use
- Danvers State Hospital - demolished due to recurring unexplainable fires in the west wing; its original staging has been repurposed into the building Avalon Bay at Danvers; admittance is no longer allowed; property is owned by Avalon Condominium Company
- Foxborough State Hospital - half demolished; condominiums
- Gaebler Children's Center - demolished; land labeled as a park
- Gardner State Hospital - buildings converted into prison
- Grafton State Hospital - demolished, admittance not permitted; owned by the state; MPs patrol frequently; one must work at Job Corps in order to gain admittance
- Medfield State Hospital - standing, allowed to walk grounds from dawn till dusk, no admittance in buildings
- Metropolitan State Hospital - mostly demolished for condominiums; one building remains abandoned on the property and one was rehabilitated into condominiums
- Northampton State Hospital - mostly demolished; A public walking tour with historical info signs was created, as well as a memorial park on Olander Dr. The main part of the Kirkbride style hospital campus was mostly redeveloped into a residential and assisted living neighborhood. It's also home to a human services nonprofit, ServiceNet, and a MA Dept. of Mental Health office. The pillars of the original gate from 1867 still stand in front of the ServiceNet building. The original fountain from the hospital was recovered and refurbished, and now stands in the memorial park in nearly the same spot it once stood when the hospital was open. The hospital campus expansion on the other side of Prince St. is now owned by L3Harris, a nuclear weapons and high-tech surveillance systems manufacturer that has contracts with the Israeli military, ICE, and police departments. It's also the 6th largest weapons contractor in the world, which has sparked much outcry and many protests from the public. The hospital's burial ground is further down the hill off of Burts Pit Rd. There's a dirt trail leading to a field with one of the walking tour signs and a bench. At least 181 unclaimed patients are buried in the field with unmarked graves.
- Pondville State Hospital - partly demolished; part converted into Caritas Southwood Community Hospital, also defunct
- Rutland Heights State Hospital - demolished; land unused; future unknown
- Taunton State Hospital - hospital is still standing and part of it demolished other buildings active; future unknown
- Lovering Colony - demolished; land unused
- Simeon E. Borden (Raynham Farm) Colony - demolished; land in use by the town of Raynham
- Westborough State Hospital - demolished for condominiums
- Worcester State Hospital - 95% demolished; Hooper Turret and Woodward Building (end of left wing) remain as of October 2014. The clock tower was demolished in 2012, to make way for a parking lot. A replica of the clocktower was later rebuilt (in the same spot) as a tribute to the old Worcester State Hospital. The new clock tower is visible from Route 9 West in downtown Shrewsbury, MA near the Shrewsbury/Worcester town line or from Clocktower Drive in Worcester MA.

== State schools ==
- Belchertown State School - partially demolished
- JT Berry State School - demolished
- Monson Developmental Center - partially disused; future unknown
- Paul A. Dever State School - demolished
- Templeton Developmental Center - demolished, empty field - future unknown
- Walter E. Fernald Developmental Center - officially closed as of November 14, 2014; partially active, in process of construction/demolition
- Wrentham State School - partially disused

== Sanitariums ==
- Attleboro Sanitarium - demolished
- Berkshire Hills Sanitarium - demolished
- Lakeville State Hospital - unused, patrolled frequently by city police
- Middlesex County Sanitarium - demolished in 2008
- Middleton Sanitarium
- Worcester County Sanitarium - demolished
- Cranberry Specialty Hospital - demolished in 2017
- Fuller Memorial Sanitarium - converted into Fuller Memorial Hospital, later renamed Fuller Hospital

== Reform schools ==
- Lyman School for Boys - disused; parts of the property now house businesses, medical office, a park, and a courthouse
- State Reform School for Boys - disused; occupied by Westborough State Hospital in 1884, land owned by town of Westborough
- Lancaster Industrial School for Girls - buildings used for various state agencies until 2024, property currently being auctioned off and transferred to the town of Lancaster

== Private institutions ==
- Adams-Nervine Asylum - repurposed
- Massachusetts Mental Health Center - demolished and rebuilt. Reopened in 2012
- Westwood Lodge Hospital - closed
