= List of hospitals in Massachusetts =

This is a list of current and former hospitals in the Commonwealth of Massachusetts, U.S. By default, the list is sorted alphabetically by name. This table also provides the hospital network of each hospital (if applicable), the city and county where it is located, whether or not it has an emergency department, when it was opened and closed, its current status, type, and former names.

- Name: The most recent name of the hospital. Former names will be listed in the last column.
- Location: The lowest level census designation of the hospital's most recent location.
- Network: The parent organization or government agency in charge of the hospital. For closed hospitals, the network will retain its name at the time of closure and will not be updated if the network changes its name (such as Union Hospital, listed as a Partners Healthcare hospital even though the network changed its name to Mass General Brigham after the hospital closed). Text will be italicized if the hospital is independent or if it is owned or operated by a public entity.
- Emergency Department: Indicates the presence of an emergency department, along with trauma designation if applicable. "Former" if the hospital used to have one.
- EMS Region: As defined by the Massachusetts Office of Emergency Medical Services. Will be filled even for facilities which predate region designations.
- Opened-Closed: The years of operation.
  - Opened, when possible, specifically refers to the date on which the facility admitted its first patient.
- Status / Type / Notes:
  - Status is in italics and is generally in reference to a hospital's inpatient operations: Active, Succeeded, or Closed. Marked "Fate Unknown" if the hospital is no longer in operation but it cannot be determined if it was closed or acquired.
  - Hospital type, when available, comes after Status. When applicable, the type will always reference data from the Massachusetts Center for Health Information and Analysis. As CHIA was formed in 2012, any hospitals which either closed before data was collected or which do not fall under its purview (such as federal facilities) will be given the most appropriate typing.
  - Notes will encompass all other appropriate information, including former names.

Note: Closures and opening dates, in the case where a hospital is acquired or merges with another, will be designated depending on how substantial the change is. For example, single hospitals purchased by a new entity will generally not be considered to have closed (such as Kindred Hospital Park View, originally Springfield Municipal Hospital, is considered for this list to have been open consistently since 1931), however simultaneous mergers of multiple hospitals may be considered as a closure of the old hospitals and opening of a new facility (such as Beth Israel Deaconess Medical Center, considered for this list to have "opened" when its predecessors, Beth Israel Hospital and New England Deaconess Hospital, "closed" and merged in 1996). Additionally, a facility which is still in business is considered "closed" if a change in operation leads to the facility no longer meeting an arguable definition of "hospital" (example: Burbank Hospital "closed" when inpatient care ended, although the location still exists as an outpatient campus of another hospital).

== List ==
Massachusetts Hospitals
Name	Network	Settlement	County	Emergency Department? (Trauma Level)	EMS Region	Opened-Closed	Status / Type / Notes
AdCare Hospital of Worcester	American Addiction Centers	Worcester	Worcester	No	II	1948-present	Active - Non-Acute - Specialty
Adams-Nervine Asylum		Jamaica Plain	Suffolk		IV	1880-c. 1976	Closed
Addison Gilbert Hospital	Beth Israel Lahey Health	Gloucester	Essex	Yes	III	1889-present	Active - Community
Amesbury Health Center	Independent	Amesbury	Essex	No	III	XXXX-1993	Closed - Former hospital, now medical offices
Anna Jaques Hospital	Beth Israel Lahey Health	Newburyport	Essex	Yes (No longer a trauma center as of October 2022)	III	1884-present	Active - Community
Arbour Hospital	Universal Health Services	Jamaica Plain	Suffolk	No	IV	1983-present	Active - Non-Acute - Behavioral Health
Athol Hospital	Heywood Healthcare	Athol	Worcester	Yes	II	1950-present	Active - Community
Baker Memorial Hospital	Massachusetts General Hospital	Boston	Suffolk		IV		Closed - Operated by Massachusetts General Hospital on its main campus.
Baldpate Hospital	Independent	Georgetown	Essex	No	III	1939-present	Active - Former hospital, now detox services
Barnstable County Hospital	Barnstable County	Pocasset	Barnstable	No	V	1918-1999	Closed - Tuberculosis sanitarium originally, later fitted with iron lungs for polio patients, closed as rehabilitation and long-term care facility.
BayRidge Hospital	Beth Israel Lahey Health	Lynn	Essex	No	III	1996-present	Active - Inpatient psychiatry
Baystate Franklin Medical Center	Baystate Health	Greenfield	Franklin	Yes	I	1894-present	Active - Community - Originally named Franklin County Public Hospital.
Baystate Mary Lane Hospital	Baystate Health	Ware	Hampshire	Yes (Former)	I	1909-2023	Closed
Baystate Medical Center	Baystate Health	Springfield	Hampden	Yes (Adult Level 1, Pedi Level 2)	I	1976-present	Active - Teaching - Formed in 1976 through the merger of the Medical Center of Western Massachusetts and Wesson Memorial Hospital.
Baystate Noble Hospital	Baystate Health	Westfield	Hampden	Yes	I	1893-present	Active - Community
Baystate Wing Hospital	Baystate Health	Palmer	Hampden	Yes	I	1913-present	Active - Community - Formerly named Wing Memorial Hospital.
Belchertown State School for the Feeble-Minded	Department of Public Health	Belchertown	Hampshire	No	I	1922-1992	Closed
Bellevue Hospital		Brookline	Norfolk		IV		Closed
Benjamin Stickney Cable Memorial Hospital		Ipswich	Essex		III	1917-1980	Closed
Berkshire Medical Center	Berkshire Health Systems	Pittsfield	Berkshire	Yes (Adult Level 3)	I	1967-present	Active - Community - Formed in 1967 through the merger of Pittsfield's Saint Luke's Hospital and Pittsfield General Hospital.
Beth Israel Deaconess Hospital – Milton	Beth Israel Lahey Health	Milton	Norfolk	Yes	IV	1903-present	Active - Community
Beth Israel Deaconess Hospital – Needham	Beth Israel Lahey Health	Needham	Norfolk	Yes	IV	1912-present	Active - Community - Originally named Glover Hospital until its affiliation with Beth Israel Deaconess Medical Center.
Beth Israel Deaconess Hospital – Plymouth	Beth Israel Lahey Health	Plymouth	Plymouth	Yes	V	1903-present	Active - Community - Originally named Jordan Hospital. Renamed when purchased by Beth Israel Health in 2014.
Beth Israel Deaconess Medical Center	Beth Israel Lahey Health	Boston	Suffolk	Yes (Adult Level 1)	IV	1996-present	Active - Academic
Beth Israel Hospital	Independent	Roxbury	Suffolk		IV	1916-1996	Succeeded - Merged with New England Deaconess Hospital in 1996, forming Beth Israel Deaconess Medical Center
Beverly Hospital	Beth Israel Lahey Health	Beverly	Essex	Yes (Adult Level 3)	III	1888-present	Active - Community
Boston Children's Hospital	Independent	Boston	Suffolk	Yes (Pedi Level 1)	IV	1869-present	Active - Specialty
Boston City Hospital	Municipal	Boston	Suffolk		IV	1864-1996	Succeeded - Merged with Boston University Medical Center Hospital in 1996, forming Boston Medical Center.
Boston Dispensary	Independent	Boston	Suffolk		IV	1796-1930	Succeeded - Merged with Floating Hospital for Children in 1930, forming New England Medical Center (now called Tufts Medical Center).
Boston Home for Incurables		Boston	Suffolk		IV	1881-XXXX	Closed - Active as a long-term care facility, no longer a hospital.
Boston Hope Medical Center	State, Municipal, Partners HealthCare, Boston Health Care for the Homeless	Boston	Suffolk	No	IV	2020 (April-June)	Closed - COVID-19 Field Hospital
Boston Hospital for Women	Independent				IV	1966-1980	Succeeded - Merged with Peter Bent Brigham Hospital and Robert Breck Hospital in 1980, forming Brigham and Women's Hospital
Boston Lying-In Hospital	Independent	Boston	Suffolk		IV	1832-1966	Succeeded - Merged with the Free Hospital for Women in 1966, forming the Boston Hospital for Women
Boston Medical Center	BMC Health System	Boston	Suffolk	Yes (Adult Level 1, Pedi Level 2)	IV	1996-present	Active - Academic - Formed in 1996 through merger of Boston City Hospital and Boston University Medical Center Hospital.
Boston Medical Center – Brighton	BMC Health System	Brighton	Suffolk	Yes	IV	1868-present	Active - Teaching - Renamed from St. Elizabeth's Medical Center in 2025.
Boston Medical Center – South	BMC Health System	Brockton	Plymouth	Yes (Adult Level 3)	V	1994-present	Active - Community - Formed in 1994 from merger of Cardinal Cushing Hospital and Goddard Memorial Hospital. Renamed from Good Samaritan Medical Center in 2025.
Boston Nursery for Blind Babies		Jamaica Plain	Suffolk		IV	1901-1995	Closed
Boston Regional Medical Center	Independent	Stoneham	Middlesex		III	1899-1999	Closed - Formerly named New England Sanitarium and Hospital, later named New England Memorial Hospital.
Boston Sanatorium	Municipal	Mattapan	Suffolk		IV	1908-XXXX	Closed - Originally named Boston Consumptives Hospital until name change in 1921. Closed mid-1900s.
Boston State Hospital	State Government	Boston	Suffolk		IV	1839-1981	Closed
Boston University Medical Center Hospital	Boston University	Boston	Suffolk		IV	1855-1996	Succeeded - Originally named the Massachusetts Homeopathic Hospital. Renamed Massachusetts Memorial Hospital in 1918. Renamed University Hospital in 1965. Merged with the Boston City Hospital in 1996, forming Boston Medical Center.
Bournewood Hospital	Bournewood Health Systems	Brookline	Norfolk	No	IV	1884-present	Active - Non-Acute - Behavioral Health - Originally named Stedman Hospital.
Bridgewater State Hospital	Department of Correction	Bridgewater	Plymouth	No	V	1855-present	Active
Brigham and Women's Faulkner Hospital	Mass General Brigham	Jamaica Plain	Suffolk	Yes	IV	1900-present	Active - Community
Brigham and Women's Hospital	Mass General Brigham	Boston	Suffolk	Yes (Adult Level 1)	IV	1980-present	Active - Academic - Formed in 1980 through merger of Robert Breck Brigham Hospital, Peter Brent Brigham Hospital, and the Boston Hospital for Women
Bristol County Tuberculosis Hospital	Bristol County	Attleboro	Bristol	No	V	1920-1960s	Closed
Brockton Hospital	Signature Healthcare	Brockton	Plymouth	Yes	V	1896-present	Active - Community - Closed between 2023 and 2024 due to fire damage.
Brockton VA Medical Center	VA Boston Healthcare	Brockton	Plymouth	No	V	1953-present	Active - U.S. Department of Veterans Affairs Hospital
Brookline Hospital		Brookline	Norfolk		IV	1945-XXXX	Unknown
Brooks Hospital		Brookline	Norfolk		IV	1915-XXXX	Unknown
Burbank Hospital	UMass Memorial Health	Fitchburg	Worcester	Former	II	1890-1997	Closed - Now an outpatient-only campus of UMass Clinton Hospital
Cambridge Hospital	Cambridge Health Alliance	Cambridge	Middlesex	Yes	IV	1918-present	Active - Teaching - Originally named Cambridge City Hospital
Cape Cod and The Islands Mental Health Center	Department of Mental Health	Pocasset	Barnstable	No	V		Active - State Operated Facility
Cape Cod Hospital	Cape Cod Healthcare	Hyannis	Barnstable	Yes (Adult Level III).	V	1920-present	Active - Community
Cardinal Cushing Hospital		Brockton	Plymouth		V	1968-1994	Succeeded - Merged with Goddard Memorial Hospital in 1994, forming Good Samaritan Medical Center.
Carney Hospital	Steward Health Care	Dorchester	Suffolk	Yes	IV	1863-2024	Closed - Teaching Close due to bankruptcy on August 31, 2024.
Central Hospital		Somerville	Middlesex	Yes	IV		Unknown
Channing Home		Boston	Suffolk		IV	1857-XXXX	Closed
Charles River Hospital	Independent	Wellesley	Norfolk	No	IV	c. 1904-2002	Closed - Behavioral health hospital, closed for financial reasons. Originally named Wiswall Sanatorium.
Charlton Memorial Hospital	Southcoast Health	Fall River	Bristol	Yes	V	1979-present	Active - Community - Formed in 1979 through the merger of Truesdale Hospital and Union Hospital, both of Fall River.
Charron Maternity Hospital	Independent	New Bedford	Bristol		V	1915-XXXX	Closed
Chelsea Marine Hospital	United States Marine Corps	Chelsea	Suffolk		IV	1857-1940	Closed
Chelsea Memorial Hospital		Chelsea	Suffolk		IV	XXXX-1996	Closed
Chelsea Naval Hospital	United States Navy	Chelsea	Suffolk		IV	1836-1974	Closed
Children's Island Sanitarium		Salem	Essex	No	III	1886-1946	Closed
Choate Memorial Hospital	Independent	Woburn	Middlesex	Unknown	IV	1909-1989	Closed
City Hospital (Fall River)		Fall River	Bristol		V		Closed
Clinton Hospital	UMass Memorial Health	Clinton	Worcester	Yes	II	1889-present	Active - Community
Clinton Hospital - Leominster Campus	UMass Memorial Health	Leominster	Worcester	Yes	II	1912-present	Active - Originally named Leominster Hospital.
Clover Hill Hospital		Lawrence	Essex		III		Unknown
Collis P. Huntington Memorial Hospital	Harvard Medical School	Boston	Suffolk		IV	1912-1942	Closed
Community Memorial Hospital		Ayer	Middlesex		II	1924-1964	Succeeded - Originally named Ayer Private Hospital. Renamed Community Memorial Hospital in 1927, when the Ayer Hospital Association took control of the hospital. Merged with Groton Community Hospital in 1964, forming Nashoba Community Hospital.
Cooley Dickinson Hospital	Mass General Brigham	Northampton	Hampshire	Yes	I	1886-present	Active - Community
Corrigan Mental Health Center	Department of Mental Health	Fall River	Bristol	No	V	1968-present	Active - State Operated Facility - Formerly named the Fall River Mental Health Center.
Cranberry Specialty Hospital	Plymouth County	Hanson	Plymouth	No	V	1919-1992	Closed
Curahealth - Boston	Curahealth	Brighton	Suffolk	No	IV	1940-2017; 2020-XXXX	Closed - Originally named Hahnemann Hospital. Later renamed Kindred Hospital after being acquired by Kindred Healthcare. Renamed Curahealth - Boston after being acquired by Curahealth in 2016. Reopened as a COVID-19 hospital in 2020.
Cutler Army Community Hospital	United States Army	Devens	Middlesex, Worcester	Unknown	II	1971-1996	Closed - Three years after closing, facility repurposed as Federal Medical Center Devens.
Dale General Hospital	United States Army (Union Army)	Worcester	Worcester		II	1864-1865	Closed - Civil War-era hospital.
Dana-Farber Cancer Institute	Independent	Boston	Suffolk	No	IV	1947-present	Active - Specialty
Danvers State Hospital	State Government	Danvers	Essex	No	III	1878-1992	Closed - Facility repurposed into housing property repurposed into medical offices
Edith Nourse Rogers Memorial Veterans Hospital	VA Bedford Healthcare	Bedford	Middlesex	No	IV	1928-present	Active - U.S. Department of Veterans Affairs Hospital
Edward P. Boland Department of Veterans Affairs Medical Center	VA Central Western Massachusetts Healthcare	Leeds	Hampshire	No	I	1924-present	Active - U.S. Department of Veterans Affairs Hospital
Elizabeth Mason Infirmary		Northampton	Hampshire		I	1920-1981	Closed
Emerson Hospital	Emerson Health	Concord	Middlesex	Yes	IV	1911-present	Active - Community
Encompass Braintree Rehabilitation Hospital	Encompass Health	Braintree	Norfolk	No	IV	1975-present	Active - Non-Acute - Rehabilitation
Encompass Health Rehabilitation Hospital of New England	Encompass Health	Woburn	Middlesex	No	IV	1967-present	Active - Non-Acute - Rehabilitation
Encompass Rehabilitation Hospital of Western Massachusetts	Encompass Health	Ludlow	Hampden	No	I	1996-present	Active - Non-Acute - Rehabilitation - Originally named Rehabilitation Institute Of Western Massachusetts, later named HealthSouth Rehabilitation Hospital of Western Massachusetts.
Essex Hospital		Salem	Essex	No	III	1773-1774	Closed
Everett Hospital	Cambridge Health Alliance	Everett	Middlesex	Yes	III	1897-present	Active - Teaching - Formerly Whidden Memorial Hospital
Fairlawn Rehabilitation Hospital	Encompass Health	Worcester	Worcester	No	II		Active - Non-Acute - Rehabilitation only since 1987.
Fairview Hospital	Berkshire Health	Great Barrington	Berkshire	Yes	I		Active - Community
Fall River Emergency Hospital		Fall River	Bristol		V	XXXX-1900	Succeeded - Merged with Fall River Hospital in 1900, forming Union Hospital.
Fall River General Hospital		Fall River	Bristol	Yes	V		Fate Unknown
Fall River Hospital		Fall River	Bristol		V	1885-1900	Succeeded - Merged with Fall River Emergency Hospital in 1900, forming Union Hospital.
Falmouth Hospital	Cape Cod Healthcare	Falmouth	Barnstable	Yes	V		Active - Community
Farren Memorial Hospital	Providence Health System	Montague City	Franklin		I	1900-1988	Closed
Federal Medical Center, Devens	Federal Bureau of Prisons	Devens (Harvard)	Worcester	No	II	1999-present	Active
Fitchburg General Hospital		Fitchburg	Worcester		II	1940-1964	Closed
Floating Hospital for Children	Tufts Medicine	Boston	Suffolk	Yes	IV	1894-1927	Succeeded - Ship was destroyed by fire in 1927, and hospital moved to a new on-shore facility. Merged with Boston Dispensary in 1930, forming New England Medical Center (now called Tufts Medical Center).
Forsyth Dental Infirmary for Children		Boston	Suffolk		IV	1914-XXXX	Closed
Foxborough State Hospital	State	Foxborough	Norfolk	No	V	c. 1890-1914	Closed - Originally named the Massachusetts Hospital for Dipsomaniacs and Inebriates.
Framingham Union Hospital	Tenet Healthcare > MetroWest Medical Center	Framingham	Middlesex	Yes	IV		Active - Community
Franciscan Children's	Independent	Brighton	Suffolk	No	IV		Active - Non-Acute - Specialty - Originally named the Joseph P. Kennedy Jr. Memorial Hospital.
Free Hospital for Women	Independent	Brookline	Norfolk		IV	1875-1966	Succeeded - Merged with the Boston Lying-In Hospital in 1966, forming the Boston Hospital for Women
Fuller Hospital	Universal Health Services	Attleboro	Bristol	No	V	1937-present	Active - Non-Acute - Behavioral Health
Gaebler Children's Center	Department of Mental Health	Waltham	Middlesex	No	IV	1955-1992	Closed
Gardner State Hospital	State	Gardner	Worcester		II	XXXX-1975	Closed
Goddard Memorial Hospital		Stoughton	Norfolk		V	XXXX-1994	Succeeded - Merged with Cardinal Cushing Hospital in 1994, forming Good Samaritan Medical Center.
Grace Hospital	Independent	Boston	Suffolk	Yes	IV	1891-1912	Closed - Originally named the Emergency Accident Hospital. Renamed the Wage Earners Emergency and General Hospital in 1899, Boston Emergency and General Hospital in 1904, and finally the Grace Hospital in 1906.
Grafton State Hospital	State	Grafton	Worcester		II	1901-1973	Closed
Groton Community Hospital		Groton	Middlesex		II	1948-1964	Succeeded - Merged with Community Memorial Hospital in 1964, forming Nashoba Community Hospital.
Grover Memorial Hospital		Revere	Suffolk		IV	XXXX-1986	Closed
Guardian Hospital		East Cambridge	Middlesex		IV		Unknown
Hahnemann Hospital (Worcester)	UMass Memorial Health	Worcester	Worcester	No	II		Closed - Now outpatient only.
Harley Private Hospital		Dorchester	Suffolk		IV		Unknown
Harrington Memorial Hospital	UMass Memorial Health	Southbridge	Worcester	Yes	II		Active - Community
Haverhill Hospital	Merrimack Health	Haverhill	Essex	Yes	III		Active - Community - Formerly Holy Family Hospital - Haverhill. Renamed in September 2025.
Haverhill Pavilion Behavioral Health Hospital	Independent	Haverhill	Essex	No	III	2008-present	Active - Non-Acute - Behavioral Health
Hebrew Rehabilitation Center	Hebrew SeniorLife	Roslindale	Suffolk	No	IV		Active - Non-Acute - Specialty
Heywood Hospital	Heywood Healthcare	Gardner	Worcester	Yes	II	1907-present	Active - Community - Formerly named Henry Heywood Memorial Hospital.
High Point Hospital	High Point Treatment Centers	Middleborough	Plymouth	No	V	XXXX-2019	Closed - Acute & Non-Acute - Behavioral Health Now McLean (Southeast on Oak Street)
Hillcrest Hospital	Berkshire Health Systems	Pittsfield	Berkshire		I	1908-XXXX	Closed - Now outpatient only.
Holden Hospital		Holden	Worcester		II	1922-1990	Closed - Originally named Holden District Hospital
Holyoke Medical Center	Valley Health System	Holyoke	Hampden	Yes	I	1893-present	Active - Community - Originally named Holyoke City Hospital
Homberg Memorial Infirmary	Massachusetts Institute of Technology	Cambridge	Middlesex	No	IV		Closed - Hospital for students of Massachusetts Institute of Technology
Hospital for Behavioral Medicine	Independent	Worcester	Worcester	No	II	2019-present	Active - Non-Acute - Behavioral Health
House of the Good Samaritan	Boston Children's Hospital	Boston	Suffolk		IV	1861-1973	Closed - Absorbed by Boston Children's Hospital in 1967.
HRI Hospital	Universal Health Services	Brookline	Norfolk	No	IV		Active - Non-Acute - Behavioral Health
Hubbard Regional Hospital	Independent	Webster	Worcester		II	1929-2009	Closed - Originally named Webster District Hospital
Hudson Hospital		Hudson	Middlesex		IV		Fate Unknown
Hunt Memorial Hospital		Danvers	Essex		III	XXXX-1990	Closed
Jamaica Plain VA Medical Center	VA Boston Healthcare	Jamaica Plain	Suffolk	No	IV		Active - U.S. Department of Veterans Affairs Hospital
Jewish Healthcare Center	Independent	Worcester	Worcester	No	II	1914-present	Active
Josiah B. Thomas Hospital	Municipal	Peabody	Essex	Yes	III	1907-1993	Closed - Acquired by Lahey Clinic from the City of Peabody in 1994.
Kenmore Hospital	Massachusetts College of Osteopathy	Fenway–Kenmore	Suffolk	Yes	IV	1939-1955	Closed
Kindred Hospital Northeast - Braintree	Kindred Healthcare	Braintree	Norfolk	No	IV	1917-2008	Closed - Originally named Norfolk County Hospital, later named Massachusetts Respiratory Hospital.
Kindred Hospital Northeast - Natick	Kindred Healthcare	Natick	Middlesex	No	IV	XXXX-2015	Closed
Kindred Hospital Northeast - Waltham	Kindred Healthcare	Waltham	Middlesex	No	IV	XXXX-2012	Closed
Kindred Hospital Park View	Vibra Healthcare	Springfield	Hampden	No	I	1931-2019	Closed - Long-term acute care and rehabilitation hospital. Originally named Springfield Municipal Hospital until sold by the city in 1996. Formerly part of Kindred Healthcare, was sold in 2013 to Vibra though it kept "Kindred" in its name.
Lahey Hospital & Medical Center	Beth Israel Lahey Health	Burlington	Middlesex	Yes (Adult Level 1)	IV	1923-present	Active - Teaching
Lahey Medical Center, Peabody	Beth Israel Lahey Health	Peabody	Essex	Yes	III	1994-present	Active - Teaching
Lakeville Hospital	State	Lakeville	Plymouth		V	1910-1992	Closed
Lawrence F. Quigley Memorial Hospital		Chelsea	Suffolk		IV		Active - Part of Veterans Home at Chelsea
Lawrence Hospital	Merrimack Health	Lawrence	Essex	Yes (Adult Level 3)	III	1875-present	Active - Community - Formerly named Lawrence General Hospital. Renamed in September 2025.
Lawrence Memorial Hospital	Tufts Medicine	Medford	Middlesex	Former	III		Active - Community
Leonard Morse Hospital	Tenet Healthcare > MetroWest Medical Center	Natick	Middlesex	Former	IV		Active - Community
Lemuel Shattuck Hospital	Department of Public Health	Jamaica Plain	Suffolk	No	IV		Active - State Operated Facility
Long Island Hospital		Long Island	Suffolk		IV	1893-XXXX	Closed
Longwood Hospital		Boston	Suffolk		IV	1907-1981	Closed - Originally named Vincent Memorial Hospital.
Lovell General Hospital	United States Army	Devens (Shirley)	Middlesex	No	II		Closed
Lovering Colony State Hospital	Department of Mental Health	Taunton	Bristol	No	V	1914-1974	Closed
Lowell General Hospital	Tufts Medicine	Lowell	Middlesex	Yes (Adult Level 3)	III	1891-present	Active - Community
Ludlow Hospital		Ludlow	Hampden		I	1907-1995	Closed
Lyman School for Boys	State	Westborough	Worcester		II	1846-1971	Closed
Malden Hospital		Malden	Middlesex	Yes	III	1982-2001	Closed
Marlborough Hospital	UMass Memorial Health	Marlborough	Middlesex	Yes	IV		Active - Community
Martha's Vineyard Hospital	Mass General Brigham	Oak Bluffs	Dukes	Yes	V	1921-present	Active - Community
Mary A. Alley Hospital		Marblehead	Essex		III	1922-c. 1965	Closed
Massachusetts Eye & Ear	Mass General Brigham	Boston	Suffolk	Yes	IV	1824-present	Active - Specialty - Originally named the Boston Eye Infirmary
Massachusetts General Hospital	Mass General Brigham	Boston	Suffolk	Yes (Adult Level 1, Pedi Level 1)	IV	1811-present	Active - Academic
Massachusetts Mental Health Center	Department of Public Health	Boston	Suffolk	No	IV	1912-present	Active - Originally named Boston Psychopathic Hospital.
McLean Hospital	Mass General Brigham	Belmont	Middlesex	No	IV	1811-present	Active - Non-Acute - Behavioral Health
McLean (SouthEast)	Mass General Brigham	Middleborough	Plymouth	No	V	1999-present	Active - Non-Acute - Behavioral Health Located on Issac Street
McLean (SouthEast at Oak Street)	Mass General Brigham	Middleborough	Plymouth	No	V	2021-Present	Active - Non-Acute - Behavioral Health Located on Oak Street - Formerly High Point Hospital
Medfield State Hospital	State	Medfield	Norfolk	No	IV	1892-2003	Closed
Medical Center of Western Massachusetts		Springfield	Hampden		I	1974-1976	Succeeded - Formed in 1974 through the merger of Springfield Hospital Medical Center and Wesson Women's Hospital. Merged with Wesson Memorial Hospital in 1976, forming Baystate Medical Center.
MelroseWakefield Hospital	Tufts Medicine	Melrose	Middlesex	Yes	III	1893-present	Active - Community
Mercy Medical Center	Trinity Health	Springfield	Hampden	Yes	I	1874-present	Active - Community
Methuen Hospital	Merrimack Health	Methuen	Essex	Yes	III		Active - Community - Formerly named Bon Secours Hospital, then Holy Family Hospital - Methuen. Renamed to current name in September 2025.
Metropolitan State Hospital	State	Waltham	Middlesex		IV	1930-1992	Closed
Middlesex County Hospital	County	Waltham & Lexington	Middlesex		IV	c. 1930-2001	Closed
Milford Regional Medical Center	Independent	Milford	Worcester	Yes	II	1903-present	Active - Community
MiraVista Behavioral Health Center	TaraVista Health Partners	Holyoke	Hampden	No	I	2021-present	Active - Non-Acute - Behavioral Health
Monson Developmental Center	State	Monson	Hampden	No	I	1855-1887; 1898-2012	Closed - Formerly named State Farm School, and later State Primary School. Also housed the state's Hospital for Epileptics starting in 1898.
Morton Hospital	Brown University Health	Taunton	Bristol	Yes	V	1889-present	Active - Community
Mount Auburn Hospital	Beth Israel Lahey Health	Cambridge	Middlesex	Yes	IV	1866-1872; 1886-present	Active - Teaching - Originally named Cambridge Hospital
Murphy Army Hospital	United States Army	Waltham	Middlesex	No	IV		Closed
Nantucket Cottage Hospital	Mass General Brigham	Nantucket	Nantucket	Yes	V	1911-present	Active - Community
Nashoba Valley Medical Center	Steward Health Care	Ayer	Middlesex	Yes	II	1964-2024	Closed - Community - Originally named Nashoba Community Hospital. Formed in 1964 through merger of Community Memorial Hospital and Groton Community Hospital. Closed on August 31, 2024 due to bankruptcy.
New England Baptist Hospital	Beth Israel Lahey Health	Boston	Suffolk	No	IV	1893-present	Active - Specialty
New England Deaconess Hospital	Independent	Boston	Suffolk		IV	1896-1996	Succeeded - Merged with Beth Israel Hospital in 1996, forming Beth Israel Deaconess Medical Center
New England Rehabilitation Hospital at Danvers	Encompass Health	Danvers	Essex	No	III		Closed
New England Rehabilitation Hospital at Lowell	Encompass Health	Lowell	Middlesex	No	III		Active
New England Sinai Hospital	Steward Health Care	Stoughton	Norfolk	No	V	1936-2024	Closed - Non-Acute - Chronic Care - Originally named the Jewish Tuberculosis Sanatorium of New England.
Newton-Wellesley Hospital	Mass General Brigham	Newton	Middlesex	Yes	IV	1881-present	Active - Community - Originally named Newton Cottage Hospital
Norfolk State Hospital	State	Norfolk	Norfolk		IV	1914-1919	Closed
North Adams Regional Hospital	Northern Berkshire Healthcare	North Adams	Berkshire	Yes	I	1884-2014; 2024-present	Active
Northampton State Hospital	State	Northampton	Hampshire		I	1858-1993	Closed
Norwood Hospital	Steward Health Care	Norwood	Norfolk	Yes	IV	1919-2020	Closed
PAM Health Specialty Hospital of Stoughton	PAM Health	Stoughton	Norfolk	No	V		Active - Non-Acute - Chronic Care
Pappas Rehabilitation Hospital for Children	Department of Public Health	Canton	Norfolk	No	IV		Active - State Operated Facility
Paul A. Dever State School	Department of Mental Health	Taunton	Bristol	No	V	1952-2002	Closed - Originally named Myles Standish School for the Mentally Retarded
Pembroke Hospital	Independent	Pembroke	Plymouth	No	V		Active - Non-Acute - Behavioral Health
Penikese Island Leper Hospital		Gosnold	Dukes	No	V	1905-1921	Closed
Peter Bent Brigham Hospital	Independent	Boston	Suffolk		IV	1913-1980	Succeeded - Merged with Robert Breck Brigham Hospital and the Boston Hospital for Women in 1980, forming Brigham and Women's Hospital
Phaneuf Hospital		Brockton	Plymouth		V		Unknown
Pittsfield General Hospital		Pittsfield	Berkshire		I	1875-1967	Succeeded - Originally named House of Mercy. Merged with Pittsfield's Saint Luke's Hospital in 1967, forming Berkshire Medical Center.
Plunkett Memorial Hospital		Adams	Berkshire		I	1918-1973	Closed
Pondville State Hospital	State	Norfolk	Norfolk		IV	1927-XXXX	
Pratt Clinic / New England Center Hospital	New England Center Medical Hospitals	Boston	Suffolk		IV	1948-1965	Succeeded - Established in 1931 as part of the Boston Dispensary. Expanded in 1938 to become the Pratt Diagnostic Hospital. Became independent from Boston Dispensary in 1946. Merged with Boston Dispensary and Boston Floating Hospital in 1965, forming the New England Center Medical Hospitals, which later became Tufts Medical Center.
Providence Behavioral Health Hospital		Holyoke		No	I		Succeeded - Now Miravista Behavioral Health
Quincy Medical Center	Steward Health Care	Quincy	Norfolk	Yes	IV	1891-2020	Closed
Revere Memorial Hospital		Revere	Suffolk		IV	1939-1968	Closed - Originally named Revere General Hospital. Converted into a nursing facility which remained open as of June 2024.
Robert Breck Brigham Hospital for Incurables	Independent	Boston	Suffolk		IV	1914-1980	Succeeded - Merged with Peter Brent Brigham Hospital and the Boston Hospital for Women in 1980, forming Brigham and Women's Hospital
Roslindale General Hospital		Roslindale	Suffolk		IV	XXXX-c. 1976	Closed - Also known as "Doctors Hospital"
Rutland Heights State Hospital	State	Rutland	Worcester		II	1898-1991	Closed - Originally named Massachusetts Hospital for Consumptives and Tubercular Patients. Renamed Massachusetts State Sanatorium in 1900, then Rutland State Sanatorium in 1919, Rutland Hospital in 1963, and finally Rutland Heights State Hospital in 1965.
Saint Anne's Hospital	Brown University Health	Fall River	Bristol	Yes	V	1906-present	Active - Community
Saint John of God Hospital		Brighton	Suffolk				Closed
Saint John's Hospital		Lowell	Middlesex		III	1867-1992	Succeeded - Merged with Saint Joseph's Hospital in 1992, forming Saints Medical Center
Saint Joseph's Hospital		Lowell	Middlesex		III	1893-1992	Succeeded - Merged with Saint John's Hospital in 1992, forming Saints Medical Center
Saint Luke's Hospital (Middleborough)		Middleborough	Plymouth		V	1920-1999	Closed
Saint Luke's Hospital (New Bedford)	Southcoast Health	New Bedford	Bristol	Yes	V	1884-present	Active - Community
Saint Luke's Hospital (Pittsfield)		Pittsfield	Berkshire		I	1917-1967	Succeeded - Merged with Pittsfield General Hospital in 1967, forming Berkshire Medical Center.
Saint Margaret's Hospital for Women	Independent	Dorchester	Suffolk		IV	1911-1993	Closed
Saint Monica's Home	Society of Saint Margaret	Roxbury	Suffolk		IV	c. 1904-XXXX	Closed - Converted into a nursing facility sometime before closing in 1988. Formerly named Saint Monica's Hospital for Colored Women.
Saint Vincent Hospital	Tenet Healthcare	Worcester	Worcester	Yes	II		Active - Teaching
Saints Medical Center		Lowell	Middlesex	Yes	III	1992-2012	Succeeded - Acquired by Lowell General Hospital in 2012
Salem Hospital	Mass General Brigham	Salem	Essex	Yes	III	1873-present	Active - Community
Sancta Maria Hospital	Daughters of Mary of the Immaculate Conception	Cambridge	Middlesex		IV	1948-1989	Closed - Converted to a nursing facility which was still active as of June 2024.
Saugus General Hospital		Saugus	Essex		III	1946-1978	Closed
Shaw Hospital		Lowell	Middlesex		III		Closed
Shriners Children's (Boston)	Shriners Hospitals for Children	Boston	Suffolk	No	IV		Active - Specialty
Shriners Children's (Springfield)	Shriners Hospitals for Children	Springfield	Hampden	No	I		Active - Specialty
Solomon Carter Fuller Mental Health Center	Department of Mental Health	Boston	Suffolk	No	IV		Active - State Operated Facility
Somerville Hospital	Cambridge Health Alliance	Somerville	Middlesex	Yes	IV	1891-2020	Closed - All inpatient services closed in 2009; emergency department closed in 2020. Now outpatient only.
South Shore Hospital	South Shore Health	Weymouth	Norfolk	Yes (Adult Level 2)	IV		Active - Community
Southcoast Behavioral Health Hospital	Southcoast Health	Dartmouth	Bristol	No	V		Active - Non-Acute - Behavioral Health
Southwood Community Hospital	Caritas Christi Health Care	Norfolk	Norfolk		IV	1927-2003	Closed - Originally named Pondville State Hospital.
Spaulding Hospital Cambridge	Mass General Brigham	Cambridge	Middlesex	No	IV		Active - Non-Acute - Chronic Care
Spaulding Rehabilitation Hospital - Boston	Mass General Brigham	Charlestown	Suffolk	No	IV	1971-present	Active - Non-Acute - Rehabilitation - Originally named the Massachusetts Rehabilitation Hospital
Spaulding Rehabilitation Hospital - Cape Cod	Mass General Brigham	East Sandwich	Barnstable	No	V	1995-present	Active - Non-Acute - Rehabilitation
Springfield Hospital Medical Center		Springfield	Hampden		I	1870-1974	Succeeded - Originally named Springfield City Hospital. Merged with Wesson Women's Hospital in 1974, forming the Medical Center of Western Massachusetts.
State Reform School for Boys	State	Westborough	Worcester		II	1848-1884	Closed
Stillman Infirmary	Harvard University	Cambridge	Middlesex	No	IV	1902-2015	Closed - Hospital for students of Harvard University
Sturdy Memorial Hospital	Independent	Attleboro	Bristol	Yes		1913-present	Active - Community
Symmes Hospital		Arlington	Middlesex	Yes	IV	1901-1999	Closed
TaraVista Behavioral Health Center	TaraVista Health Partners	Devens (Harvard)	Worcester	No	II		Active - Non-Acute - Behavioral Health
Taunton State Hospital	Department of Mental Health	Taunton	Bristol	No	V	1854-present	Active - State Operated Facility
Templeton Developmental Center	State	Templeton	Worcester		II	1899-2015	Closed - Originally named the Templeton Farm Colony.
Tewksbury State Hospital	Department of Public Health	Tewksbury	Middlesex	No	III	1854-present	Active - State Operated Facility
The Dimock Center	Independent	Roxbury	Suffolk	No	IV	1862-present	Active - Originally named New England Hospital for Women and Children.
Tobey Hospital	Southcoast Health	Wareham	Plymouth	Yes	V		Active - Community
Truesdale Hospital		Fall River	Bristol		V	1905-1979	Succeeded - Merged with Union Hospital of Fall River in 1979, forming Union-Truesdale Hospital (renamed Charlton Memorial Hospital in 1980).
Tufts Medical Center	Tufts Medicine	Boston	Suffolk	Yes (Adult Level 1)	IV	1930-present	Active - Academic - Originally named New England Medical Center, formed in 1930 through merger of the New England Center Hospital, Boston Dispensary, and Floating Hospital for Children.
UMass Memorial Medical Center	UMass Memorial Health	Worcester	Worcester	Yes (Adult Level 1, Pedi Level 1)	II		Active - Academic
Union Hospital (Fall River)		Fall River	Bristol		V	1900-1979	Succeeded - Formed in 1900 from the merger of Fall River Hospital and Fall River Emergency Hospital. Merged with Truesdale Hospital of Fall River in 1979, forming Union-Truesdale Hospital (renamed Charlton Memorial Hospital in 1980).
Union Hospital (Lynn)	Partners HealthCare	Lynn	Essex	No (Former)	III	Closed 2020	Closed
Valley Springs Behavioral Health Hospital	Independent	Holyoke	Hampden	No	I	2023-present	Active
Vibra Hospital of Southeastern Massachusetts	Vibra Healthcare	New Bedford	Bristol	No	V		Active - Non-Acute - Rehabilitation
Vibra Hospital of Western Massachusetts	Vibra Healthcare	Rochedale	Worcester	No	II		Active - Non-Acute - Chronic Care
Vibra Hospital of Western Massachusetts - Springfield	Vibra Healthcare	Springfield	Hampden	No	I		Closed
Walden Behavioral Care	Monte Nido	Dedham	Norfolk	No	IV	2003-present	Active - Non-Acute - Behavioral Health - Acquired by Monte Nido in 2021
Walter E. Fernald Developmental Center	Department of Mental Retardation	Waltham	Middlesex	No	IV	1848-2014	Closed - Originally named the Experimental School for Teaching and Training Idiotic Children, later renamed Walter E. Fernald State School.
Waltham Hospital		Waltham	Middlesex		IV	1887-2002	Closed
Wesson Memorial Hospital		Springfield	Hampden		I	1906-1976	Succeeded - Originally named the Hampden Homeopathic Hospital. Merged with the Medical Center of Western Massachusetts in 1976, forming Baystate Medical Center.
Wesson Women's Hospital		Springfield	Hampden		I	1908-1974	Succeeded - Merged with Springfield Hospital Medical Center in 1974, forming the Medical Center of Western Massachusetts.
West Roxbury VA Medical Center	VA Boston Healthcare	West Roxbury	Suffolk	Yes	IV	1943-present	Active - U.S. Department of Veterans Affairs Hospital
Westborough Behavioral Healthcare Hospital	Signature Healthcare	Westborough	Worcester	No	II	2018-present	Active - Non-Acute - Behavioral Health
Westborough State Hospital	State	Westborough	Worcester	No	II	1884-2010	Closed - Originally named Westborough Insane Hospital
Western Massachusetts Hospital	Department of Public Health	Westfield	Hampden		I	1910-present	Active - State Operated Facility
Westover Air Force Base Hospital	United States Air Force	Westover Air Force Base	Hampden	No	I	c. 1930-1974	Closed
Westwood Lodge Hospital	Universal Health Services	Westwood	Norfolk		IV		Closed
Whitinsville Hospital	Clerics Regular, Ministers to the Sick	Whitinsville	Worcester		II	1964-1988	Closed - Converted into a nursing facility.
Whittier Rehabilitation Hospital - Bradford	Whittier Health Network	Haverhill	Essex	No	III		Active - Non-Acute - Rehabilitation
Whittier Rehabilitation Hospital - Westborough	Whittier Health Network	Westborough	Worcester	No	II		Active - Non-Acute - Rehabilitation - Formerly Olympus Specialty Hospital
Williams Hospital	United States Air Force	Sandwich	Barnstable	Yes	V	1936-1973	Closed - Military hospital
Winchendon Hospital		Winchendon	Worcester		II	1907-1982	Closed - Originally named Millers River Hospital. Renamed in 1927. Transitioned to outpatient only following acquisition by Heywood Hospital in 1982.
Winchester Hospital	Beth Israel Lahey Health	Winchester	Middlesex	Yes	IV	1912-present	Active - Community
Winthrop Community Hospital		Winthrop	Suffolk		IV	1904-1992	Closed - Originally named the Metcalf Hospital. Renamed in 1922.
Worcester City Hospital		Worcester	Worcester		II	1871-1991	Closed
Worcester County Hospital	Worcester County	Boylston	Worcester		II	1931-1993	Closed
Worcester Recovery Center and Hospital	Department of Mental Health	Worcester	Worcester	No	II	2012-present	Active
Worcester State Hospital	Department of Mental Health	Worcester	Worcester	No	II	1833-2012	Closed - State Operated Facility
Wrentham Developmental Center	Department of Developmental Services	Wrentham	Norfolk	No	IV	1910-present	Active
