= WRCH =

WRCH may refer to:

- WRCH (FM), a radio station (100.5 FM) licensed to serve New Britain, Connecticut, United States
- Worcester Recovery Center and Hospital, a psychiatric hospital in Worcester, MA
- Wrch1, a protein signaling chemical.
