= Hillcrest Hospital (disambiguation) =

Hillcrest Hospital may refer to:

- Hillcrest Hospital, in Cuyahoga County, Ohio
- Hillcrest Hospital (Pittsfield, Massachusetts)

== See also ==
- UC San Diego Medical Center, Hillcrest
