= AdCare Hospital =

Specialty hospital in Massachusetts

Adcare Hospital
- American Addiction Centers

Geography
- Location: Worcester, Massachusetts, United States
- Coordinates: 42°16′34.4″N 71°47′41.7″W

Organization
- Type: Specialist

Services
- Standards: Joint Commission
- Emergency department: No
- Beds: 114
- Speciality: Substance abuse

History
- Former name: Doctors Hospital
- Opened: 1948

Links
- Website: adcare.com
- Lists: Hospitals in Massachusetts

AdCare Hospital of Worcester (originally named Doctors Hospital) is a substance abuse treatment hospital located in Worcester, Massachusetts. With 114 inpatient beds and a variety of outpatient services in Massachusetts, AdCare is the only private hospital in Massachusetts specifically dedicated to substance abuse treatment.

As of 2018, AdCare is owned by American Addiction Centers, a national chain of providers.

== History ==
Doctors Hospital was founded in March 1948 after 21 physicians purchased the former Lincoln Hospital, which closed the previous year, and renovated it in order to ensure stability of the old structure. For most of its history, Doctors Hospital served as a general medical-surgical hospital.

The hospital first offered inpatient substance abuse treatment starting in 1975, when it opened a ten-bed alcoholism unit. In 1984, due to surges in demand for these services in the area, Doctors Hospital converted into a specialty hospital, primarily offering substance abuse treatment. The hospital was formally renamed AdCare Hospital of Worcester in 1987 to reflect this specialization.

In March 2018, AdCare was purchased by American Addiction Centers for $85 million.

== Adcare Rhode Island ==
In 2015, AdCare purchased SSTAR of North Kingstown, an inpatient treatment center in Rhode Island. Originally opened in 1977, the North Kingstown facility is located on a wooded 29-acre parcel of land.

In 2021, the Rhode Island facility was struck by a fire which destroyed a hall connecting two buildings. While there were no injuries, all patients needed to be evacuated and the damaged structure needed to be rebuilt. Work on the new section began in 2024 and is expected to be completed by 2025 with an addition of 18 patient beds.
