= Lovering Colony State Hospital =

William C. Lovering Colony State Hospital
- Massachusetts Department of Mental Health

Geography
- Location: 45 Davis St, Taunton, Massachusetts, United States
- Coordinates: 41°54′16.29″N 71°7′36.93″W

Organization
- Type: Specialist

Services
- Beds: 100
- Speciality: Female Psychiatric hospital

History
- Former names: William Croade Lovering Colony of Taunton State Hospital, Lovering Colony of Taunton State Hospital, William C Lovering Colony for Women
- Construction started: 1912
- Founded: 1914
- Closed: 1974

Links
- Lists: Hospitals in Massachusetts

William C. Lovering Colony State Hospital was a state mental hospital located in Taunton, Massachusetts. It acted as a female sub-hospital of Taunton State Hospital which was abandoned. It is named after former United States Congressman William C. Lovering.

== See also ==
- List of defunct Massachusetts State Mental Facilities
