= MetroWest Medical Center =

- Tenet Healthcare
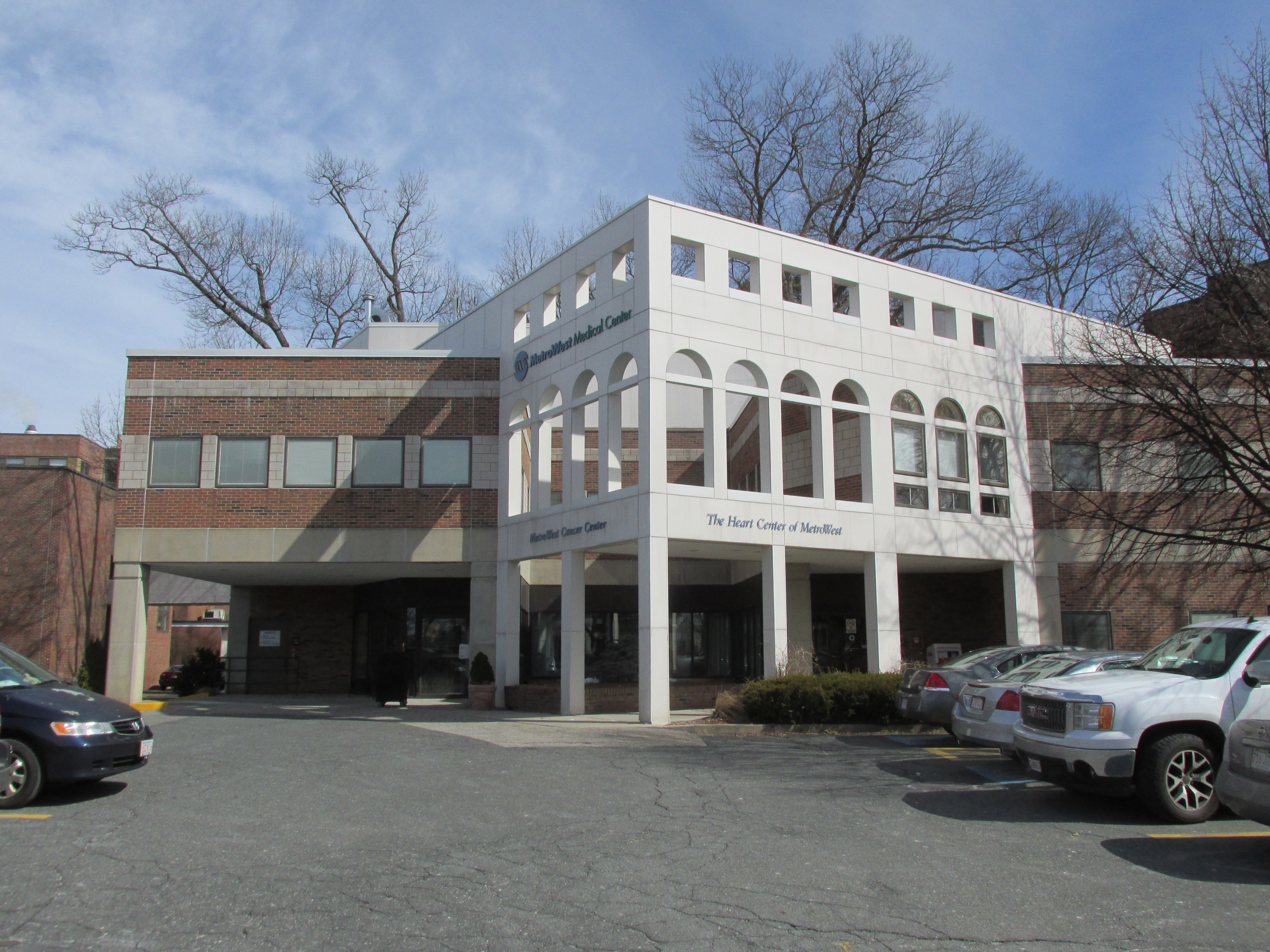
- MetroWest Cancer Center

Geography
- Location: Framingham and Natick, Massachusetts, United States
- Coordinates: 42°17′04.49″N 71°25′08.51″W

Organization
- Type: Teaching

History
- Opened: 1992

Links
- Website: www.mwmc.com
- Lists: Hospitals in Massachusetts

MetroWest Medical Center is a teaching hospital in Framingham and Natick, Massachusetts.

It is the largest health care provider in the MetroWest region between Boston and Worcester. MWMC was formed by the 1992 merger of two hospitals in neighboring towns: Framingham Union Hospital and Natick's Leonard Morse Hospital; the two hospitals have a combined capacity of 302 beds. It was acquired by Columbia/HCA in 1996; Tenet Health Systems in 1999; Vanguard Health Systems in 2009; and once again Tenet Healthcare Corp. in 2013 when Tenet acquired Vanguard. MWMC also operates an outpatient diagnostic and rehabilitation facility, MetroWest Wellness Center, in Framingham. MetroWest is affiliated with the Tufts Children's Hospital.

== See also ==
- Health care in the United States
- Massachusetts General Hospital, also known as MGH
- University of Massachusetts, Worcester, medical school
