= BayRidge Hospital (Massachusetts) =

Psychiatric hospital in Lynn, Massachusetts

- Beth Israel Lahey Health

Geography
- Location: Lynn, Massachusetts, United States
- Coordinates: 42.4716°N 70.9569°W

Organization
- Type: Specialist

Services
- Emergency department: No
- Speciality: Behavioral Health

Helipads
Number	Length		Surface
Number	ft	m	Surface
			Newburyport/Rockport Line; Bus 424, 435, 450

History
- Opened: 1996

Links
- Website: beverlyhospital.org/locations/bayridge-hospital
- Lists: Hospitals in Massachusetts

BayRidge Hospital is a non-profit inpatient behavioral health hospital located in Lynn, Massachusetts, operated by nearby Beverly Hospital. The hospital opened in 1996. Beverly Hospital's parent company, non-profit Northeast Health System, affiliated with Lahey Clinic in 2011, forming Lahey Health System. Lahey Health merged with Beth Israel Deaconess in 2019, creating Beth Israel Lahey Health (BILH). Today, BayRidge remains operated by Beverly Hospital, under the BILH banner.
