= Westover Air Force Base Hospital =

Coordinates: 42°11′51.41″N 72°33′22.57″W

- United States Air Force

Geography
- Location: Massachusetts, United States

Organization
- Type: Military

History
- Founded: 1930s
- Closed: 1974

Links
- Lists: Hospitals in Massachusetts

The Westover Air Force Base Hospital is a former hospital at Westover Air Force Base. With the reduction of the base to a reserve base in 1974, the hospital closed. The buildings stood for decades as objects of urban legend for local children until they were finally torn down in the early 1990s.

== See also ==
- List of military installations in Massachusetts
