= Worcester City Hospital =

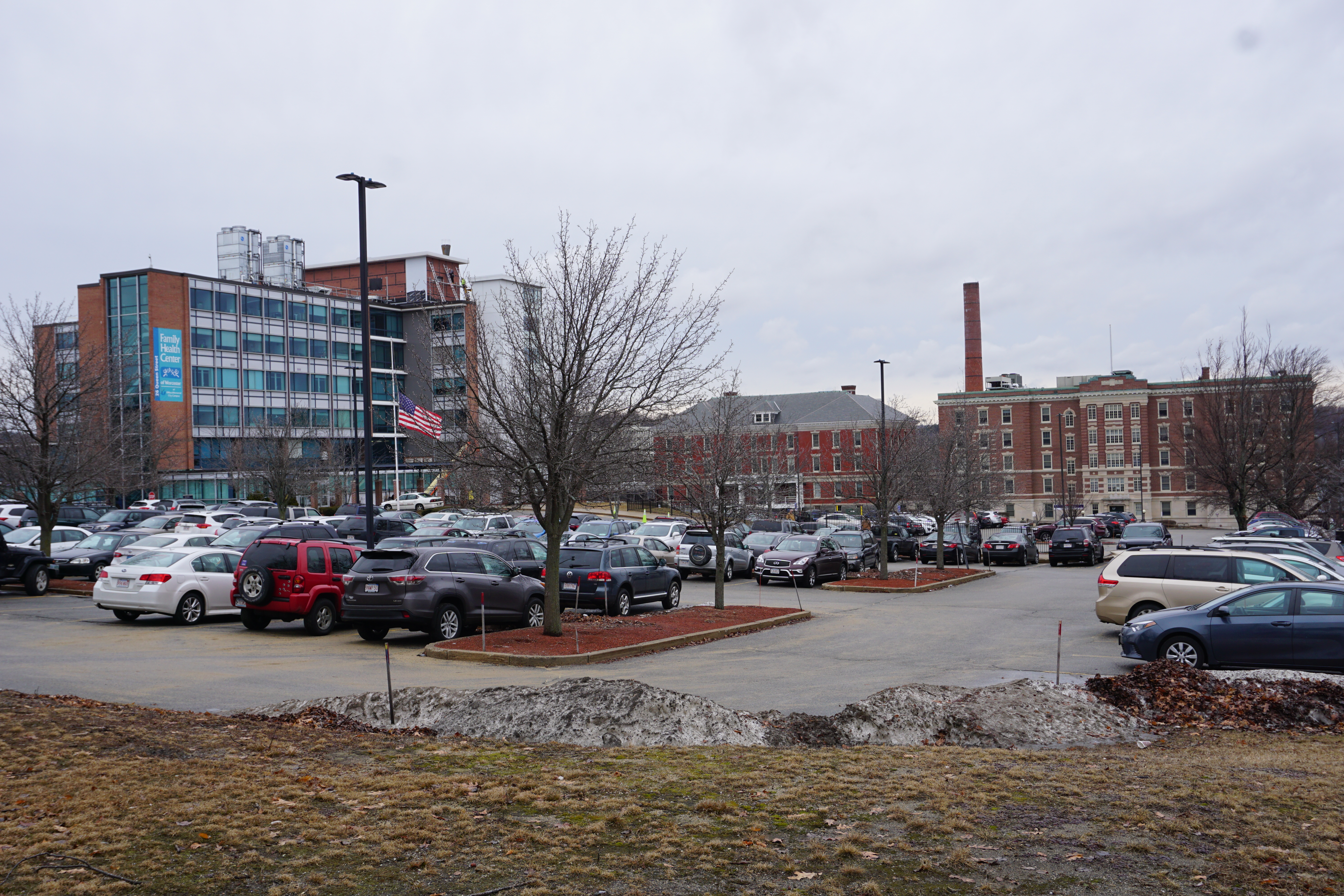
- Former Worcester City Hospital Campus

Geography
- Location: 26 Queen Street, Worcester, Massachusetts, United States
- Coordinates: 42.259265°N 71.814977°W

History
- Founded: 1871
- Closed: 1991

Links
- Lists: Hospitals in Massachusetts

Worcester City Hospital was a public hospital in Worcester, Massachusetts from 1871 to 1991. It was established by an act of the Massachusetts state legislature and initially funded with a $200,000 donation from Worcester philanthropist George Jacques. The hospital was initially run out of the Abijah Bigelow house (at the corner of Front and Church Streets). As of 1988, the 271-bed hospital had an occupancy rate of only 39 percent. The hospital was closed in 1991 due to financial difficulty and its campus at 26 Queen Street now houses a non-profit community health center called the Family Health Center of Worcester.
