= Middlesex County Hospital =

Hospital in Massachusetts

- Middlesex County, Massachusetts

Geography
- Location: Waltham and Lexington, Massachusetts, United States
- Coordinates: 42°24′32.42″N 71°13′22.69″W

History
- Opened: 1930s
- Closed: 2001

Links
- Lists: Hospitals in Massachusetts

The Middlesex County Hospital was operated by Middlesex County from the 1930s until 2001. Its property straddles the towns of Waltham and Lexington, Massachusetts. Originally a tuberculosis hospital, it eventually became the county hospital for Middlesex until its closure. The property was sold and redeveloped into a condominium community. It is located near the old Metropolitan State Hospital, which was closed in 1992 and has also been redeveloped into housing.
