= Foxborough State Hospital =

Historical hospital in Massachusetts

- Commonwealth of Massachusetts

Geography
- Location: Foxborough, Massachusetts, United States
- Coordinates: 42°4′41″N 71°15′30″W

History
- Constructed: 1889
- Opened: c. 1890
- Closed: 1914

Links
- Lists: Hospitals in Massachusetts
- Foxborough State Hospital
- U.S. National Register of Historic Places
- U.S. Historic district
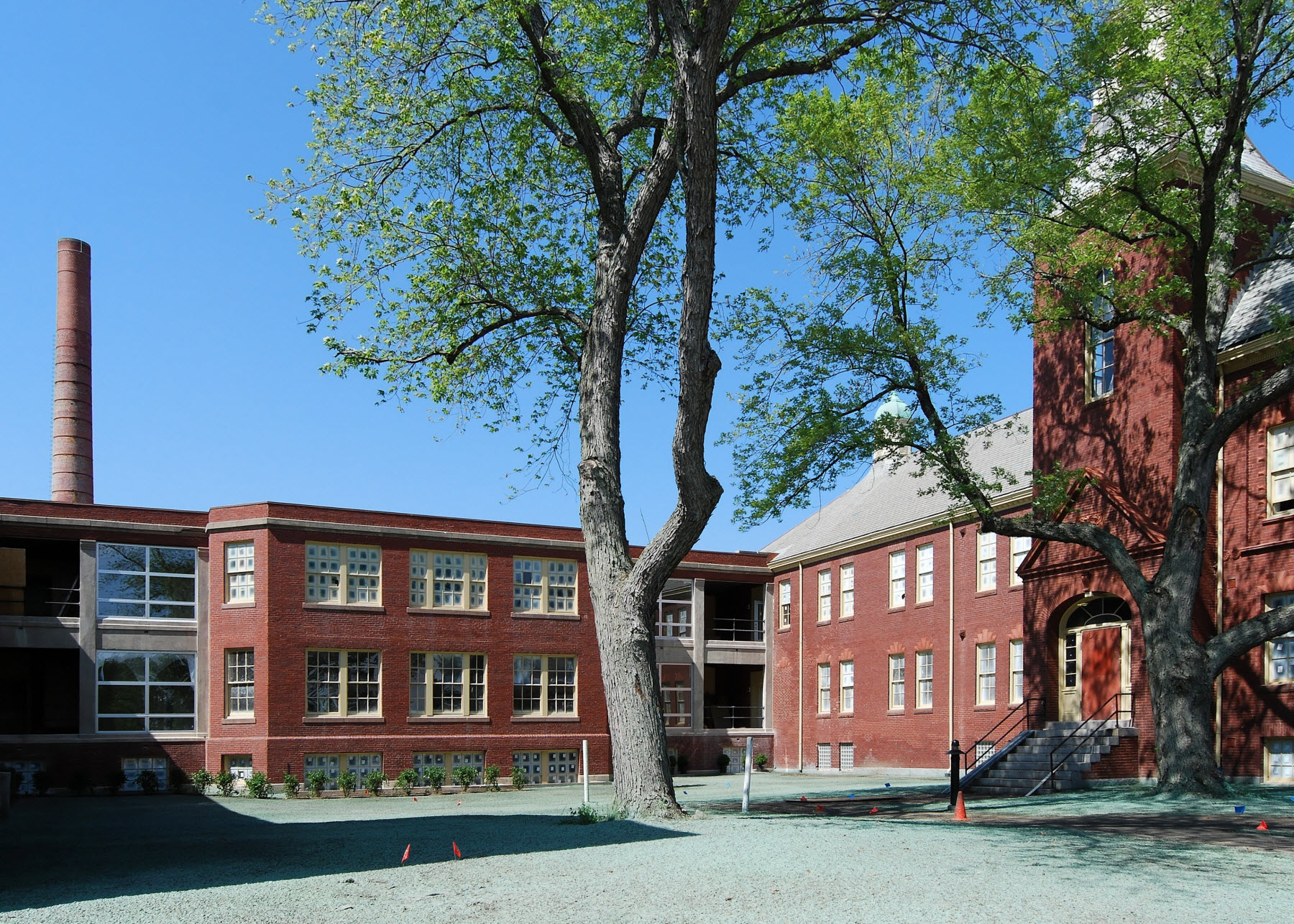

- Location within Massachusetts Location within the United States
- Location: Foxborough, Massachusetts
- Built: 1889
- Architect: Brigham & Soffard; McLaughlin & Burr
- Architectural style: Classical Revival, Colonial Revival, Queen Anne
- MPS: Massachusetts State Hospitals And State Schools MPS
- NRHP reference No.: 94000695
- Added to NRHP: July 19, 1994

Foxborough State Hospital, historically known as the Massachusetts Hospital for Dipsomaniacs and Inebriates, is a historic medical treatment facility at the junction of Chestnut and Main Streets in Foxborough, Massachusetts. The creation of an alcohol abuse treatment facility was authorized by state legislation in 1889, and the Foxborough campus was developed in the 1890s. The original campus consisted of a series of residential wards in an L shape, with an administration building at the center, and a variety of ancillary support buildings on the grounds. Problems with the facility, including its location (whose access to roads and railroads gave easy access to escaping inmates), prompted the state to move the substance abuse facility in 1914 to a new campus in Norfolk. The Foxborough campus was then adapted for use as a standard mental hospital. The surviving 19th-century elements of the campus were listed on the National Register of Historic Places in 1994.

The hospital was formally closed in 1975, but the complex saw other minor uses until it was completely vacated in 1996. In the 2000s the oldest buildings in the complex were rehabilitated and adapted for use as mixed-income housing.

Redevelopment of the hospital property began in 2005, with one of the largest buildings being torn down to make way for a shopping plaza. As of mid-2009, the plaza is complete, the main building has been transformed into luxury condominiums, and other structures have been renovated and made into single and multiple-family housing. However, many buildings were razed to make way for homes or open land, and a few still remain standing and unused, such as the former hospital auditorium.

== See also ==
- National Register of Historic Places listings in Norfolk County, Massachusetts
