= Barnstable County Hospital =

Coordinates: 41°41′10.84″N 70°36′4.66″W

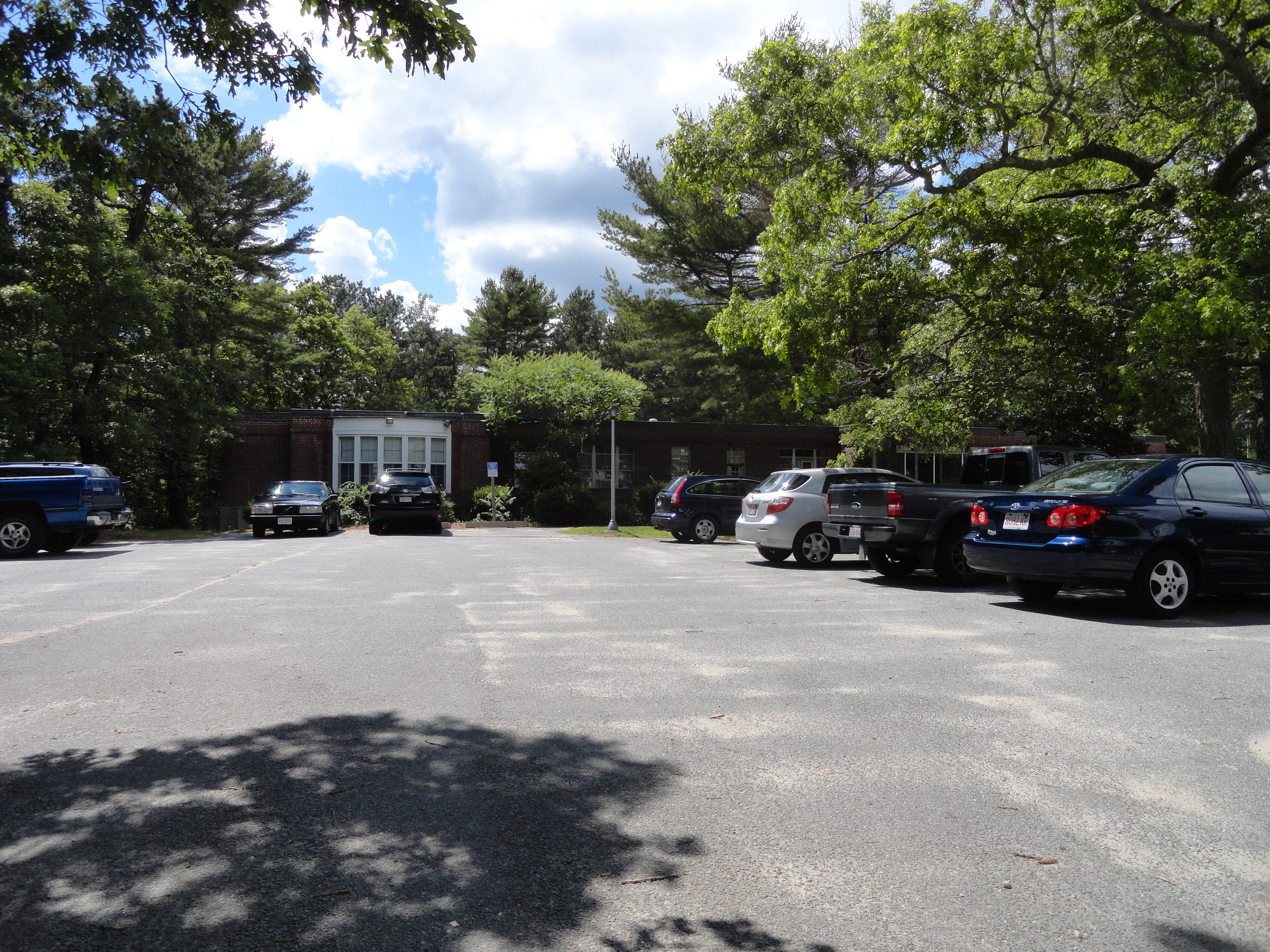
- Building on the grounds of the former Barnstable County Hospital

Geography
- Location: Pocasset, Massachusetts, United States

Organization
- Type: Specialist

Services
- Emergency department: No
- Speciality: Tuberculosis; Rehabilitation

History
- Opened: 1918
- Closed: 1999
- Demolished: 2003

Links
- Lists: Hospitals in Massachusetts

Barnstable County Hospital was a public hospital in Pocasset, Massachusetts, owned and operated by Barnstable County. The hospital opened in 1918 as a tuberculosis sanatorium and served multiple functions throughout its history. During the 1920s and 1930s, it hosted children's summer camp. In the 1940s, it was equipped with iron lungs to treat patients during the polio epidemic. In the 1980s and 1990s, it functioned as a rehabilitation and long-term care facility.

In 1995, due to significant financial difficulties faced by Barnstable County, the hospital began the process of winding down its operations. In 1996, the county secured a $1.25 million loan to cover closure and debt-related expenses. The hospital ceased all operations by 1999. In 2003, many of the hospital's buildings were demolished to make way for the construction of a $10.9 million assisted living facility.

The hospital also conducted the autopsies of John F. Kennedy Jr., Carolyn Bessette-Kennedy, and Lauren Bessette following their plane crash off the coast of Martha's Vineyard in June 1999.
