= Truesdale Hospital =

Historical hospital in Massachusetts

Geography
- Location: Fall River, Massachusetts, United States
- Coordinates: 41°43′41″N 71°8′7″W

History
- Opened: 1905
- Closed: 1979

Links
- Lists: Hospitals in Massachusetts
- Truesdale Hospital
- U.S. National Register of Historic Places
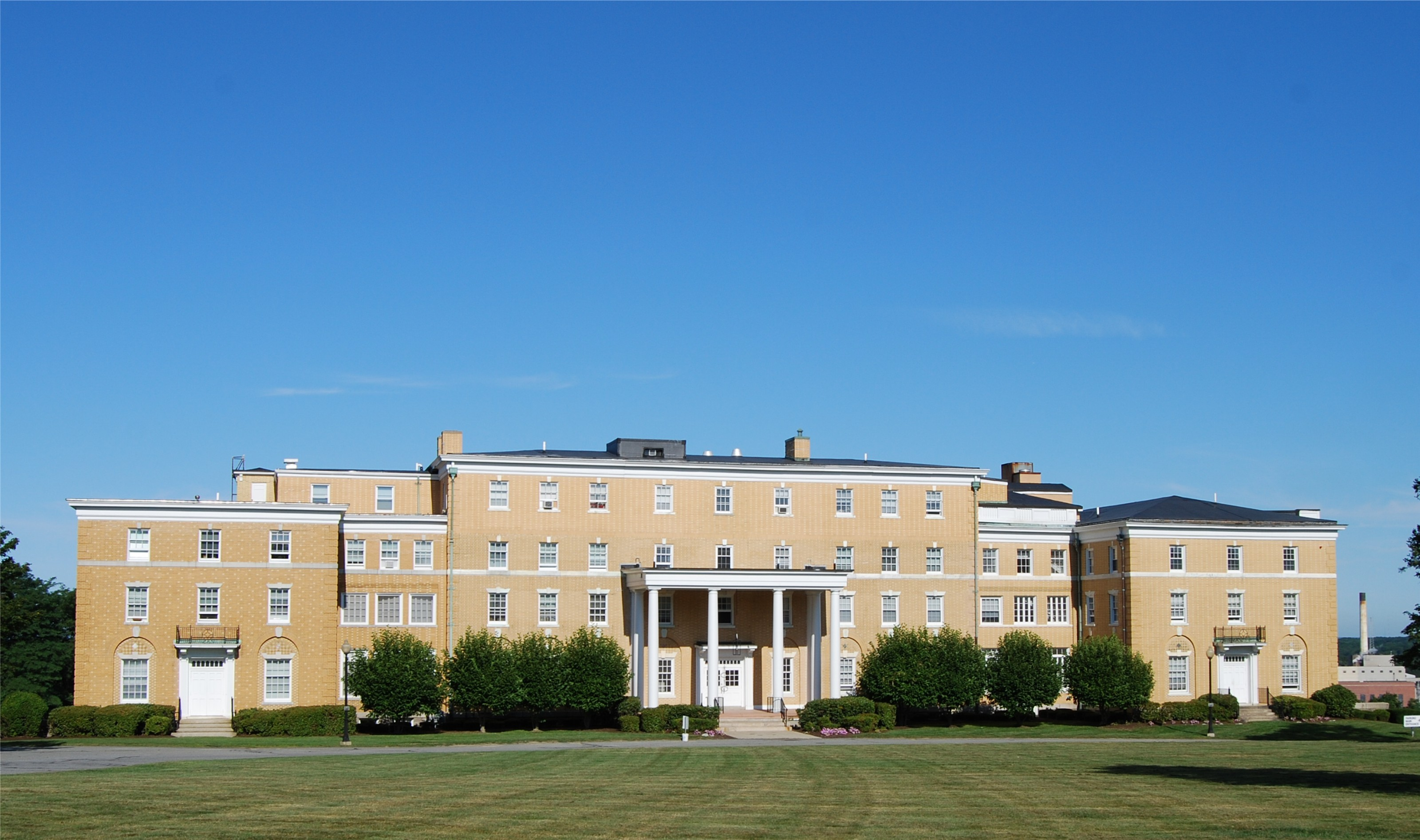

- Location within Massachusetts Location within the United States
- Location: Fall River, Massachusetts
- Built: 1912
- Architect: Hooper, Parker Morse
- Architectural style: Colonial Revival
- MPS: Fall River MRA
- NRHP reference No.: 86000801
- Added to NRHP: April 15, 1986

Truesdale Hospital is a historic former hospital building located at 1820 Highland Avenue in Fall River, Massachusetts. It was built in 1920 and added to the National Register of Historic Places in 1986. It has since been converted into apartments, known as The Highlands.

== History ==
The hospital was founded by Dr. Philemon E. Truesdale in 1905. It was originally located in the former First Baptist Church parsonage, on the corner of Winter and Cherry Streets in Fall River.

The new Truesdale Hospital was built in 1912. A south wing was added in 1923, increasing bed capacity to one hundred. A new surgical wing was added in 1927, with a gift from Earle P. Charlton. In 1980, Truesdale Hospital merged with Union Hospital and was renamed Charlton Memorial Hospital.

The hospital also established a nursing school in 1912, which graduated its first class in 1915. Students were required to live in a residence on the hospital grounds. The nursing school closed in 1972.

The Truesdale Hospital Clinic was previously located on Rock Street in Fall River. This building is still standing, and is now part of the Lower Highlands Historic District.

== See also ==
- National Register of Historic Places listings in Fall River, Massachusetts
