= Worcester Recovery Center and Hospital =

- Shown within Massachusetts

Geography
- Location: Worcester, Massachusetts, United States
- Coordinates: 42.2793°N 71.7693°W

Organization
- Type: Specialist

Services
- Beds: 320
- Speciality: Psychiatry

History
- Founded: 2012

Links
- Website: www.mass.gov/locations/worcester-recovery-center-and-hospital-wrch
- Lists: Hospitals in Massachusetts

Worcester Recovery Center and Hospital is a 320-bed hospital opened on August 16, 2012 in Worcester, Massachusetts that replaces both Worcester State Hospital and part of Taunton State Hospital since some is still in use. This hospital aims to be recovery driven in the aspect of finding alternative and productive methods to help individuals who struggle with a psychiatric diagnosis.
