= Worcester County Hospital =

Hospital in Massachusetts

- Worcester County, Massachusetts

Geography
- Location: Boylston, Massachusetts, United States
- Coordinates: 42°19′27.96″N 71°45′50.54″W

History
- Opened: 1931
- Closed: 1993

Links
- Lists: Hospitals in Massachusetts

Worcester County Hospital was a hospital operated by Worcester County which was operational from 1931 until 1993 in Boylston, Massachusetts. Originally opened as a tuberculosis hospital, the hospital eventually became the county hospital for Worcester until its closure in 1993.
