= Hillcrest Hospital (Pittsfield, Massachusetts) =

Hospital in Massachusetts

- Berkshire Health Systems

Geography
- Location: Pittsfield, Massachusetts, United States
- Coordinates: 42.4581°N 73.2811°W

History
- Opened: 1908

Links
- Lists: Hospitals in Massachusetts

Hillcrest Hospital is a 77-bed general hospital located at 165 Tor Court, Pittsfield, Massachusetts. It was founded in 1908 by Dr. Charles Harper Richardson, who saw the need for a surgical hospital in the community. This was the 2nd hospital in Pittsfield at the time.

Hillcrest moved to its current location in 1951. In 1996 Hillcrest Hospital merged with Berkshire Medical Center, and is now (2021) the Hillcrest Campus of BMC.
