= Gardner State Hospital =

Historical hospital in Massachusetts

- Commonwealth of Massachusetts

Geography
- Location: Gardner, Massachusetts, United States
- Coordinates: 42°34′47.29″N 71°56′30.59″W

History
- Closed: 1975

Links
- Lists: Hospitals in Massachusetts

Gardner State Hospital is a historic mental hospital located in Gardner, Massachusetts. The hospital was closed in 1975, and is now operated as North Central Correctional Institution.
