= Wrentham Developmental Center =

Historical Hospital in Massachusetts

- Massachusetts Department of Developmental Services

Geography
- Location: Wrentham, Massachusetts, United States
- Coordinates: 42°4′58″N 71°19′8″W

Services
- Emergency department: No

History
- Former name: Wrentham State School
- Constructed: 1909
- Opened: 1910

Links
- Website: www.mass.gov/locations/wrentham-developmental-center
- Lists: Hospitals in Massachusetts
- Wrentham State School
- U.S. National Register of Historic Places
- U.S. Historic district
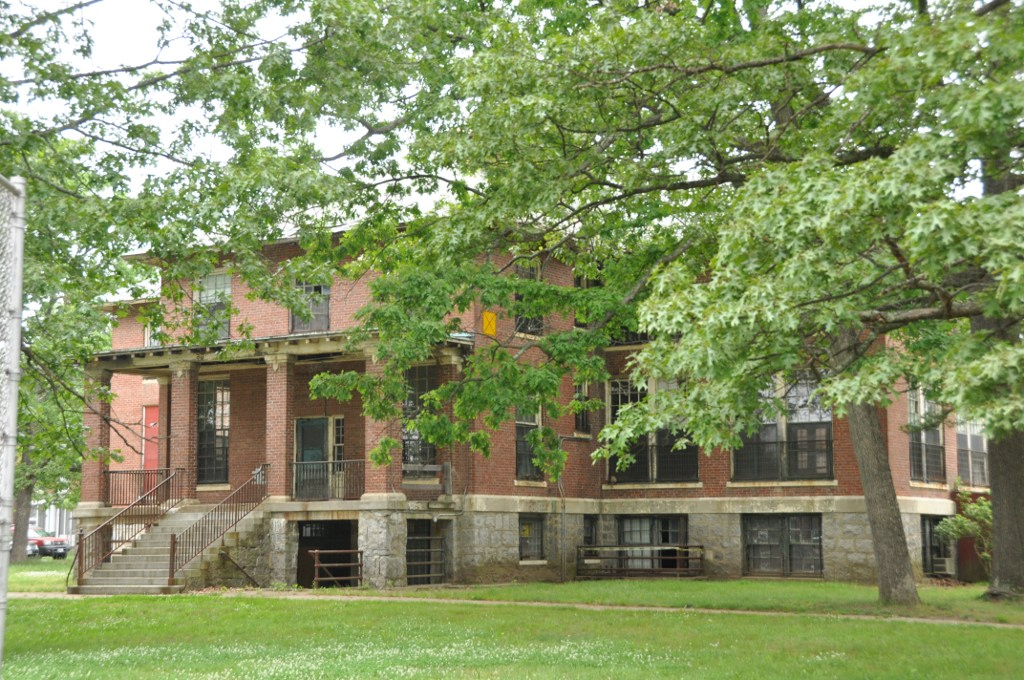
- One of the housing wards at the school

- Location within Massachusetts Location within the United States
- Location: Emerald St., Wrentham, Massachusetts
- Area: 700 acres (280 ha)
- Built: 1906
- Architect: Kendall & Taylor
- Architectural style: Federal, Colonial Revival, Bungalow/Craftsman
- MPS: Massachusetts State Hospitals And State Schools MPS
- NRHP reference No.: 93001490
- Added to NRHP: January 21, 1994

The Wrentham Developmental Center, formerly Wrentham State School, is a historic state-run medical facility for the treatment of psychiatric and developmental disorders. It is located on a large campus at the junction of Emerald and North Streets in Wrentham, Massachusetts. The school was authorized by the state in 1906, and the first phase of the campus was developed between 1909 and 1917. The school opened in 1910. The school had a typical patient population of 1,200-1,300 during the 1920s. The name was changed in the 1990s. The school campus was added to the National Register of Historic Places in 1994.

== History ==
The school was established in 1906 by the state as its second institution for "feeble-minded" children, after the Fernald School in Waltham. The latter school was instrumental in the school's early days, providing both staff and patients. School trustees purchased 450 acres (180 ha) of land north of Wrentham center, which was later expanded to more than 700 acres (280 ha). Two farmhouses, dating to the late 18th and early 19th centuries, were adapted for early use, while the school's early buildings were built. Later adapted to house the superintendent and his assistant, one of them still stands at the junction of North and Dedham Streets.

Through the 1920s the school expanded in size, building patient wards, employee housing, school facilities, and agricultural buildings to support the farm work some of the patients engaged in. By the end of World War II, the school had a student population of about 2,000, over its nominal capacity of 1,800. It underwent further expansion in the 1950s, and reached a peak population of 2,163 in 1965. In 1975, the state was forced by legal action to shift away from institutional treatment of developmentally disabled people. The Superintendent, Dr. John D. Webster fought the cutbacks; but ultimately Governor Michael Dukakis put an end to it and the school's population was reduced to 628 by 1989. Significant portions of the school's lands, mainly east of North Street and south of Emerald Street, have been adapted to other uses, as have portions of the surviving campus buildings.

== See also ==
- National Register of Historic Places listings in Norfolk County, Massachusetts
