= Monson Developmental Center =

Historical hospital in Massachusetts

- Commonwealth of Massachusetts

Geography
- Location: Monson, Massachusetts, United States
- Coordinates: 42°8′43″N 72°20′4″W

History
- Former names: State Farm School; State Primary School; Hospital for Epileptics
- Constructed: 1854
- Opened: 1855
- Closed: 2012

Links
- Lists: Hospitals in Massachusetts
- Monson Developmental Center
- U.S. National Register of Historic Places
- U.S. Historic district
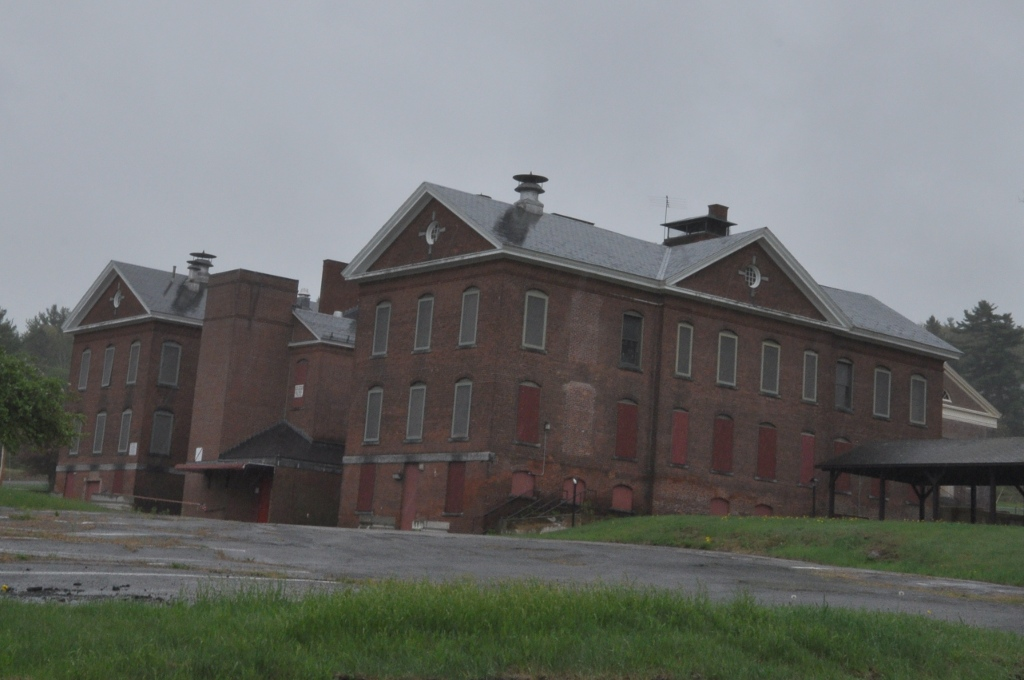

- Location within Massachusetts Location within the United States
- Location: Monson, Massachusetts
- Built: 1854
- Architectural style: Colonial Revival, Classical Revival, Bungalow/Craftsman
- MPS: Massachusetts State Hospitals And State Schools MPS
- NRHP reference No.: 93001483
- Added to NRHP: January 21, 1994

The Monson Developmental Center was a Massachusetts state facility in Monson, Massachusetts. The property, whose core has been in state control since 1854, historically housed a variety of facilities for providing services to the indigent or sick. It was closed in 2012, and the state is (as of 2017) soliciting bids for sale and reuse of the developed portions of the property.

== History ==
In 1854 the Commonwealth of Massachusetts acquired 175 acres (71 ha) of land in northern Monson, on which it erected an almshouse to provide facilities for poor immigrants fleeing the Great Famine of Ireland. In 1855, it was renamed the State Farm School, and later the State Primary School, and it housed children who were wards of the state. It served in this role until 1887. In 1898 the state's Hospital for Epileptics opened on the grounds, using the old facilities and adding several more buildings. Over the first half of the 20th century the facility was expanded, growing to 72 buildings on 662 acres (268 ha) of land.

The property was listed on the National Register of Historic Places in 1994. Since then, its population has continued to decline, and the state in 2008 announced plans to close the facility. In 2012 the state relocated the last 31 residents, and began to consider the future of the property. After the facility was closed, the state planned to demolish nearly half the buildings, citing either their deteriorated condition or the presence of asbestos. In 2017, the state opened a request for proposals for redevelopment of about 256 acres (104 ha), representing most of the previously developed portion of the land.

== See also ==
- Belchertown State School, a similar state-owned facility
- National Register of Historic Places listings in Hampden County, Massachusetts
