= VA Central Western Massachusetts Healthcare System =

Hospital network in Massachusetts, United States

The United States Department of Veterans Affairs (VA) Central Western Massachusetts Healthcare System is a health care organization that provides care to Massachusetts’ Veterans. It is part of the VA New England Healthcare System, one of 21 Veterans Integrated Service Networks (VISNs) within the VA. The VA New England Healthcare System includes VA medical centers in Boston and all six New England states. The VA Central Western Massachusetts Healthcare System includes a medical center in Northampton and community-based outpatient clinics (CBOCs) in Greenfield, Worcester, Pittsfield, Springfield and Fitchburg.

== History ==
On May 16, 1922, President Warren G. Harding approved construction of a new Veterans Hospital in Northampton, Massachusetts, one of 12 new Veterans Hospitals across the country. It was the first Veterans Hospital in Massachusetts and also the first neuro-psychiatric hospital for Veterans in the Country. The 286-acre (116 ha) site on what is locally known as "Bear Hill" was cleared beginning in July 1922. The Northampton Veterans Hospital opened its doors on May 12, 1924, to the first 10 Veterans transferred from the Northampton State Hospital. By the end of the year the number of patients in residence rose to almost 500 with 260 employees. Up until the end of World War II, most care at the hospital was custodial in nature, but in 1946, the hospital was reorganized and shifted from custodial care to more active treatment.

Today, the VA Central Western Massachusetts Healthcare System provides service to Veterans across the central and western Massachusetts region. This includes medical, rehabilitative, primary, mental health and long-term care. It provides care on both an inpatient and outpatient basis, serving a population of more than 120,000 veterans across five counties. It offers care in residential settings that include board & care homes and skilled nursing care. The VA Central Western Massachusetts Healthcare System is affiliated with the University of Massachusetts School of Medicine and also has academic affiliations with schools in dentistry, nursing, psychology, psychiatry, optometry, occupational therapy, social work, pharmacy and other health professional and technical fields.

The VA Central Western Massachusetts Healthcare System offers the following Special Programs:

- Polytrauma Support Clinic Team
- Specialized inpatient PTSD program
- Inpatient services for the chronically mentally ill
- Substance abuse intensive outpatient program
- Homeless Veterans programs
- Substance abuse, compensated work therapy, transitional residence program
- Vocational rehabilitation therapy program (supported employment, transitional work experience, incentive therapy, compensated work therapy)
- Weight management for Veterans program
- End-of-life/palliative care
- Visual Impairment Services
- Women Veterans health program
- Smoking cessation

== Northampton Campus ==
The Northampton Campus, located in the village of Leeds, Mass., is the headquarters for the VA Central Western Massachusetts Healthcare System. The campus includes a medical center that provides primary and secondary levels of medical care. The center has 85 behavioral health beds and a 44-bed nursing home care unit. A 16-bed substance abuse, compensated work therapy, transitional residence is located off-campus in Northampton center.

The Northampton Campus is accessible by car and taxi and is located on the Pioneer Valley Transit Authority (PVTA) bus line. Veterans requiring inpatient care at other New England VA medical centers can travel, via shuttle, from the Northampton campus to the following destinations on the following days, leaving at 7:30 a.m.:

- VA Connecticut (Newington and West Haven campuses): Monday-Friday
- VA Boston (West Roxbury and Jamaica Plain campuses): Monday-Friday
- VA White River Junction: Wednesday and Thursday only
- VA Providence: Friday only

== Community Based Outpatient Clinics ==
The VA Central Western Massachusetts Healthcare System operates five Community Based Outpatient Clinics (CBOCs) located throughout central and western Massachusetts. Clinics are located in the towns of Greenfield, Worcester, Pittsfield, Springfield and Fitchburg. The CBOCs provide general outpatient care, preventative health and education services, medical screenings, social work and mental health clinics, and referrals to specialized programs and inpatient services in the VA New England Healthcare System.
