= Cranberry Specialty Hospital =

Tuberculosis sanatorium in Hanson, Massachusetts, U.S.

Coordinates: 42°2′48.32″N 70°52′19.21″W

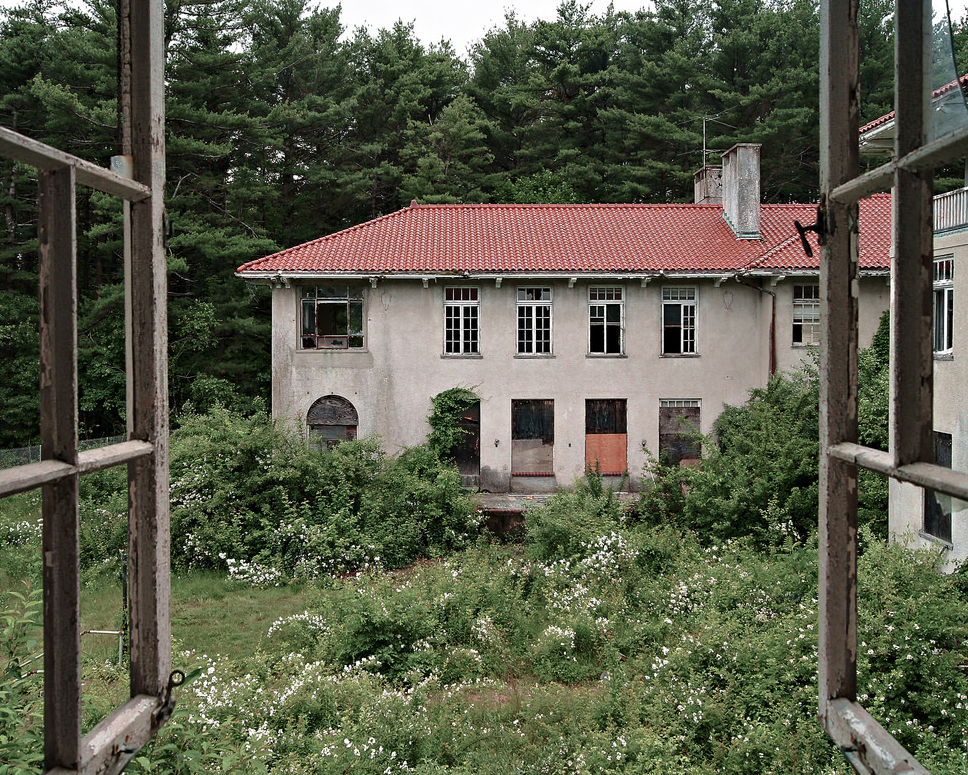
- Former names: Plymouth County Hospital (1919–1984)

General information
- Status: Demolished
- Type: Tuberculosis Sanatorium
- Architectural style: Mediterranean Revival & Italianate
- Location: 266 High Street, Hanson, MA 02341
- Construction started: 1917
- Inaugurated: May 31, 1919
- Demolished: March 29, 2017

Height
- Top floor: 3 stories (center)

Technical details
- Floor count: 2 stories

Cranberry Specialty Hospital was a tuberculosis sanatorium and later a chronic care facility in Hanson, Massachusetts operated by Plymouth County, Massachusetts, which was operational from 1919 until 1992.

The hospital was dedicated on May 31, 1919 as Plymouth County Hospital. It was known for its architecture and its modern treatment of tuberculosis-stricken children. The hospital was one of the first to feature a modern, state-of-the-art heating system. An annex was built by 1922 that included additional rooms and wards for patients, as well as an auditorium for patients and employees to enjoy. The hospital was also equipped with a large kitchen, a two-slab morgue, and a laboratory.

In 1965, under the direction of superintendent C. Clark Streeter, the hospital transitioned from a tuberculosis sanatorium to a chronic care facility. The hospital complex was renamed the Cranberry Specialty Hospital of Plymouth County in c. 1984. During the late 1980s, the hospital struggled with finances, lack of admission, and inadequate treatment. The cost of maintaining the aging historic campus proved too high, and in 1992 the hospital was shut down and relocated to Middleborough, MA, where the new location would shut itself down before 2000.

Though most of the campus has remained closed since 1992, the Annex has been used by the Plymouth County Bureau of Criminal Investigation, Plymouth County Beekeepers Association, the University of Massachusetts, 4-H, and is also currently home to the Hanson Food Pantry. The remainder of the property has fallen into a state of disrepair and is condemned. Plans to renovate the large hospital building fell apart after a string of devastating arson fires in the early to mid-2000s that destroyed entire wards, as well as the auditorium, kitchen, and nurses' living area. In 2009 the Town of Hanson erected a perimeter fence around the main building to keep children, vandals, and urban explorers out of the dangerous condemned buildings, which also contain toxic levels of lead.

Following another large fire in 2016, the Town of Hanson appropriated the funds to demolish the large number of abandoned buildings on the grounds. Partial demolition occurred in October 2016 when the far two right wings of the hospital were demolished. Further demolition of the remainder of the hospital building has started as of January 2017. On March 28, 2017, the physical demolition of the historic hospital building began. As of March 29, 2017, all of the remaining buildings have been entirely demolished.

The hospital was known for its Mediterranean Revival/Italianate architecture, a rarity in rural Massachusetts.

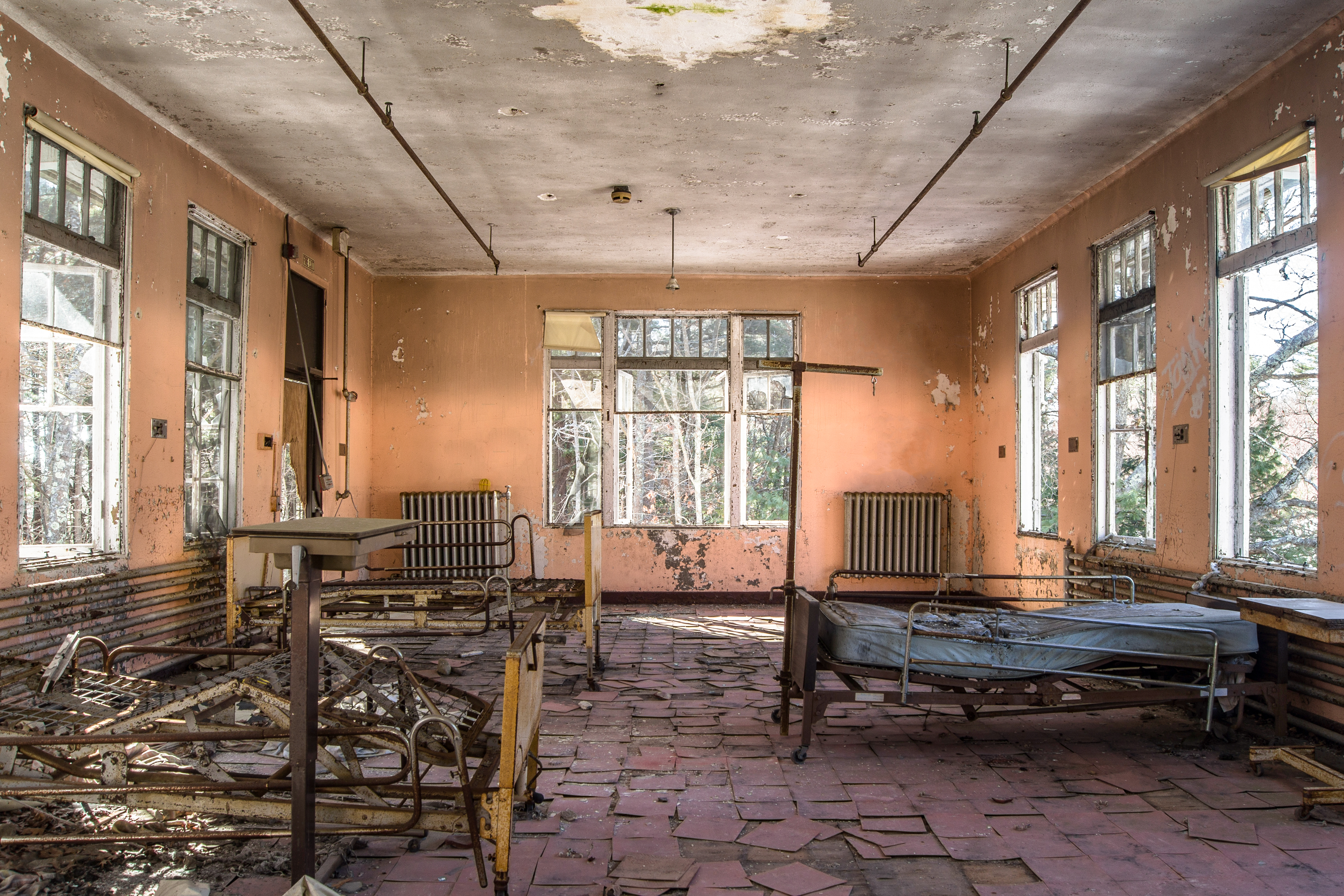
Open-air patient ward in 2014. This ward was demolished in 2016.

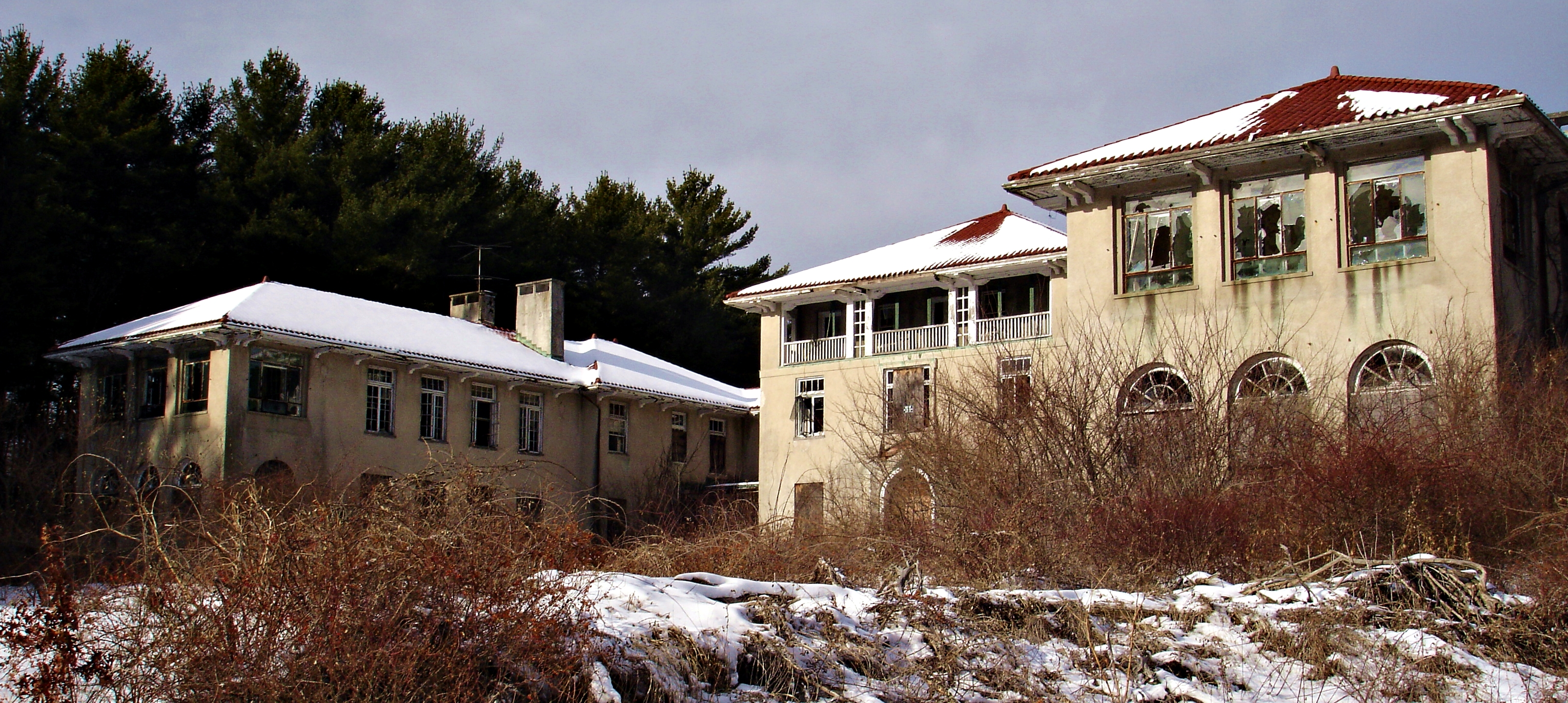
View of the original wards and administration in the center, 2010.

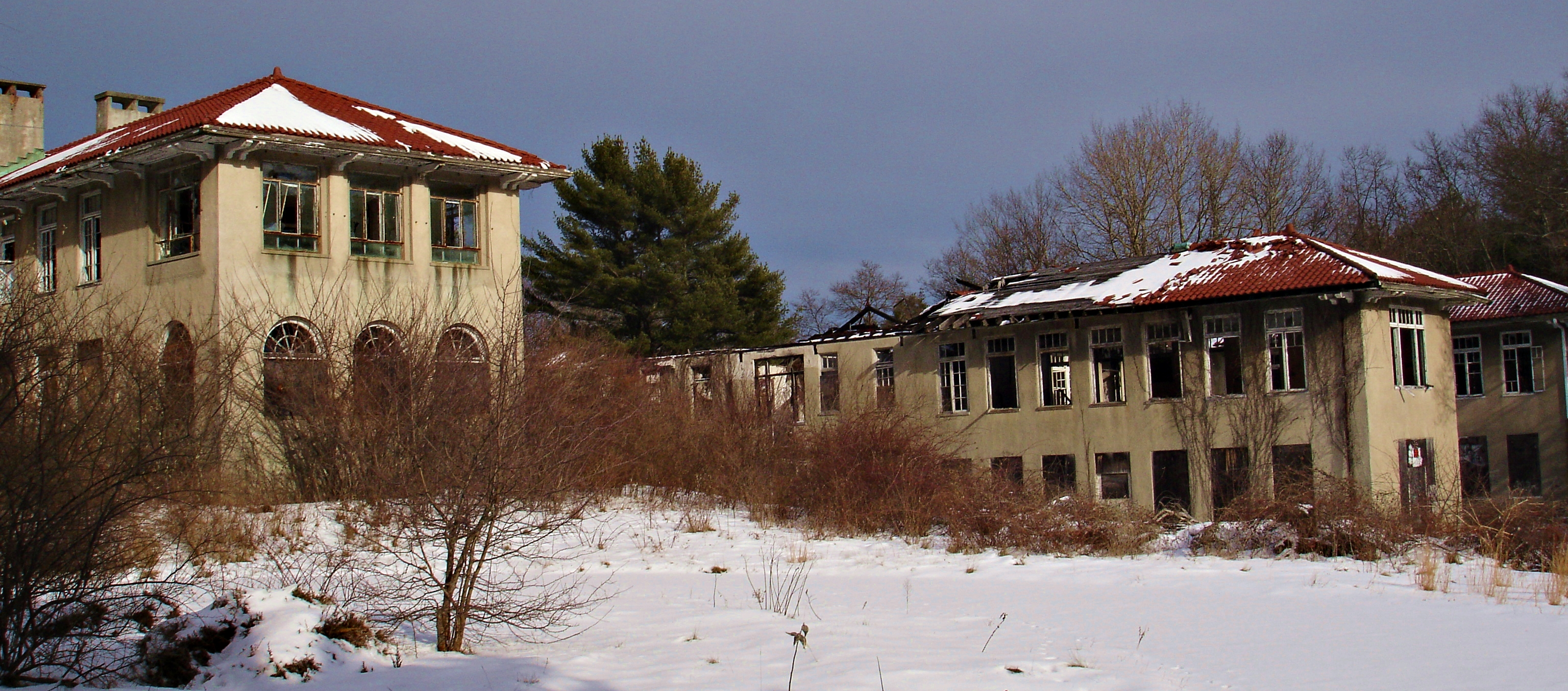
View of the two annex wards on the right-hand side, built in 1921, demolished in 2016.

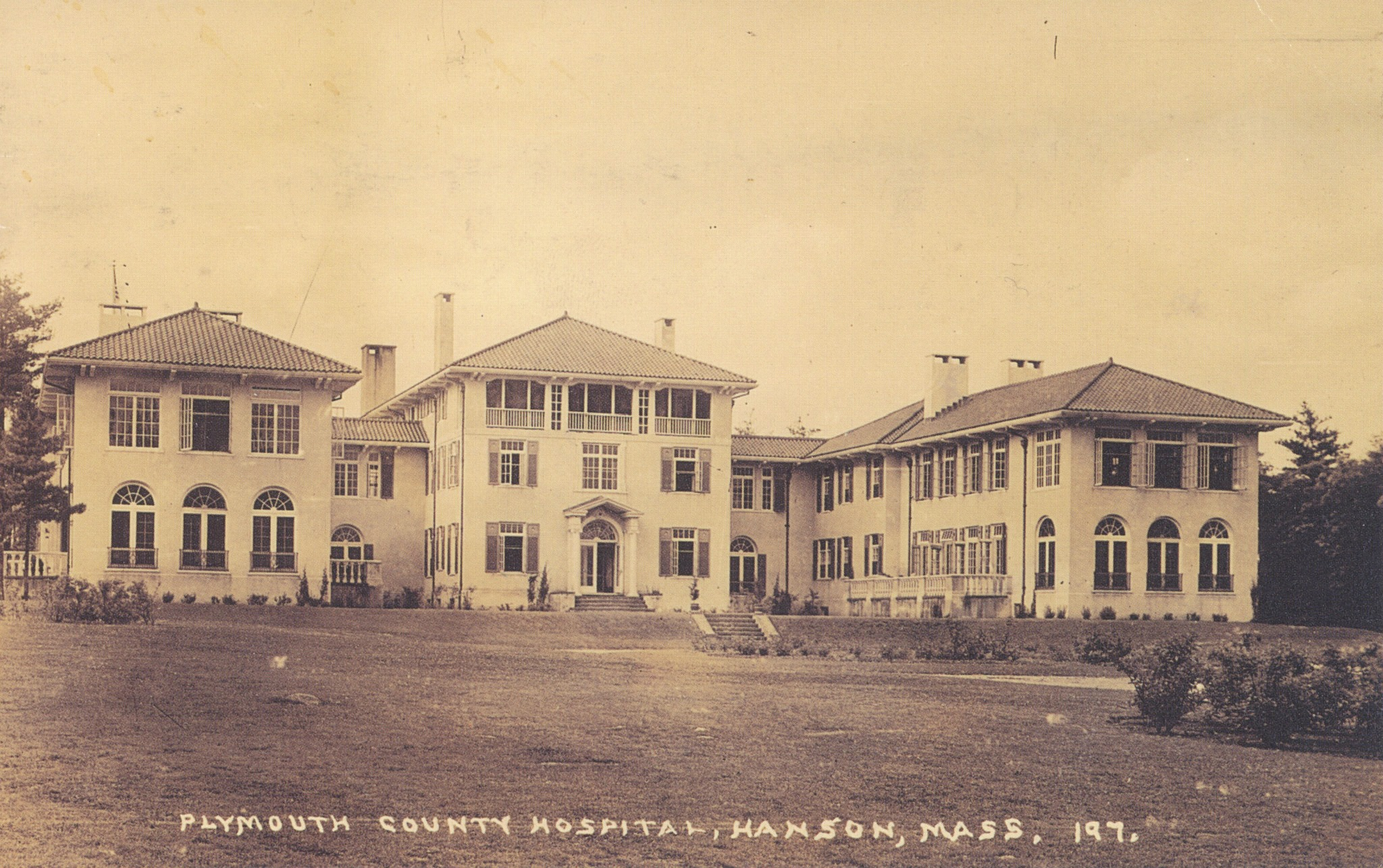
Postcard view c. 1919–1920

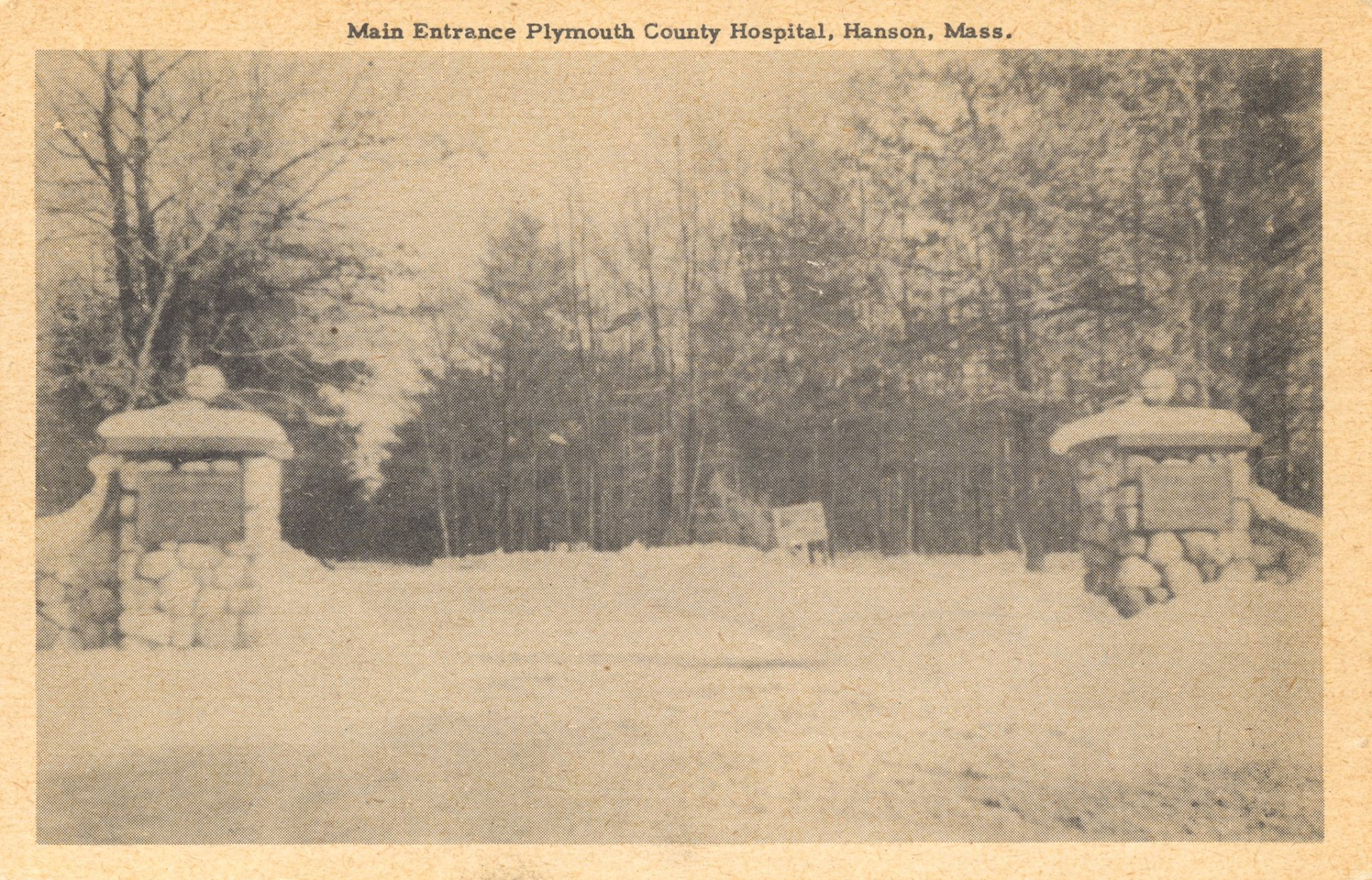
Main entrance to the hospital (located on High Street)

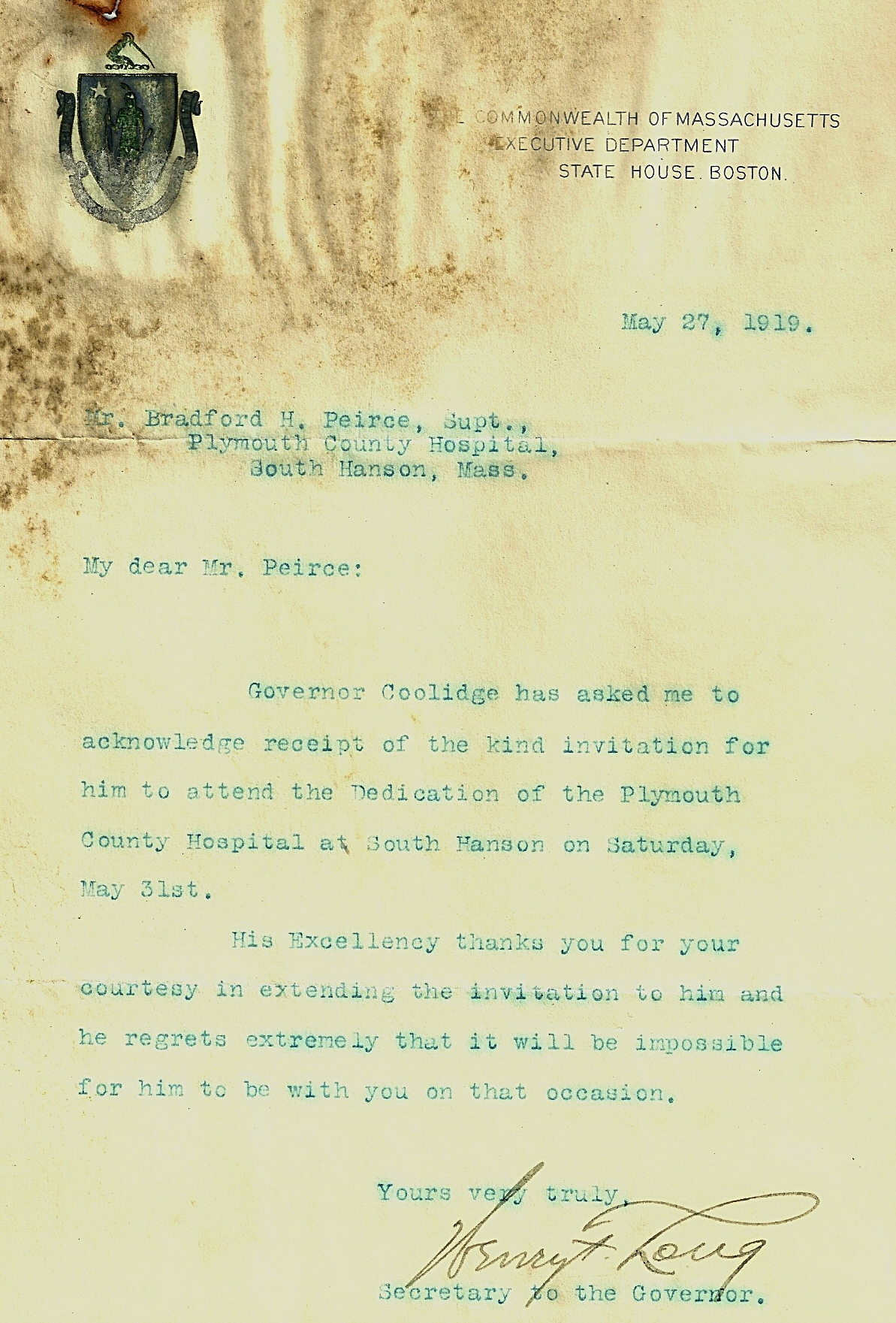
Document from Governor Calvin Coolidge's secretary stating Coolidge would not be able to attend the ceremony of dedication on May 31, 1919.

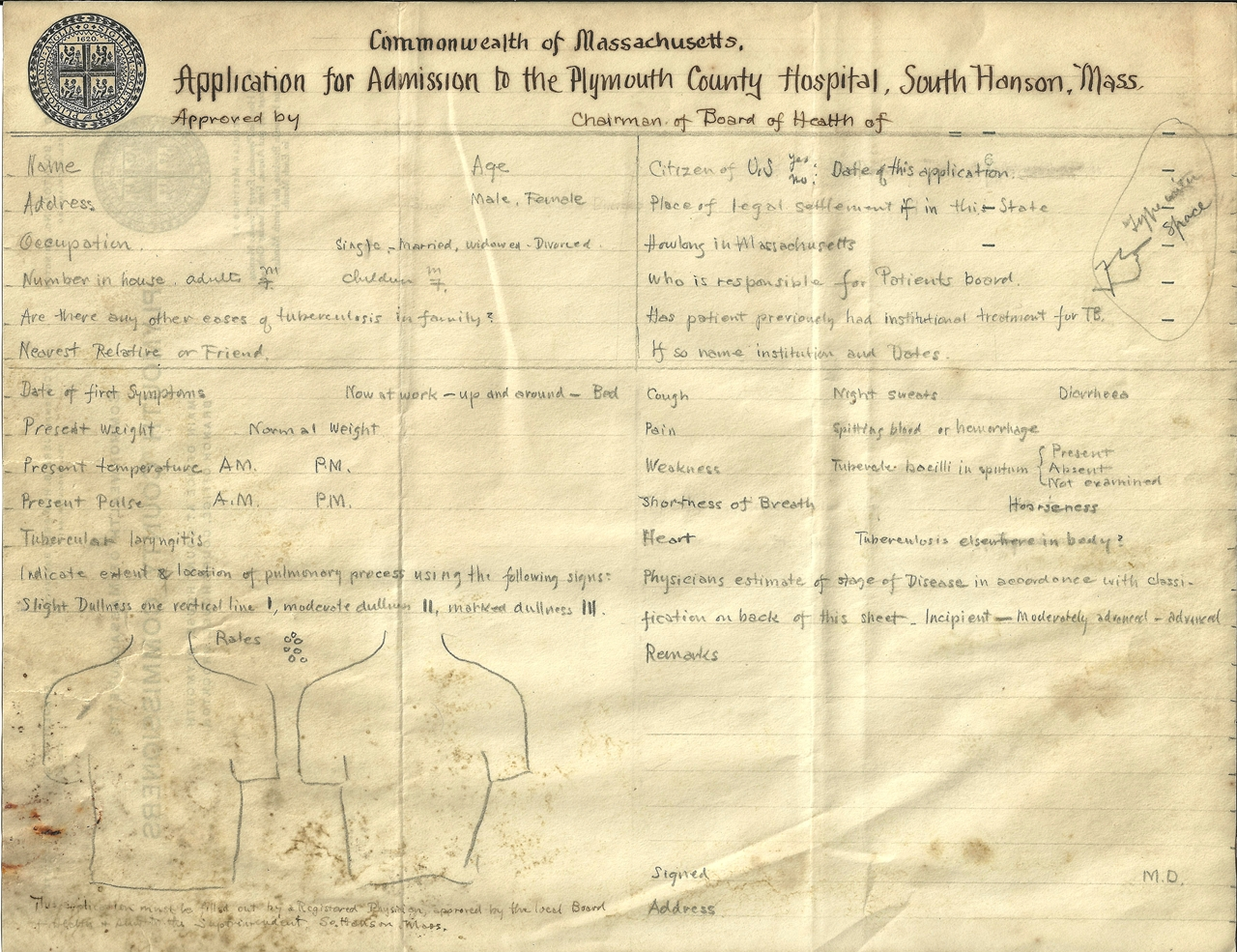
Handwritten draft for admission to the sanitarium. c. 1919

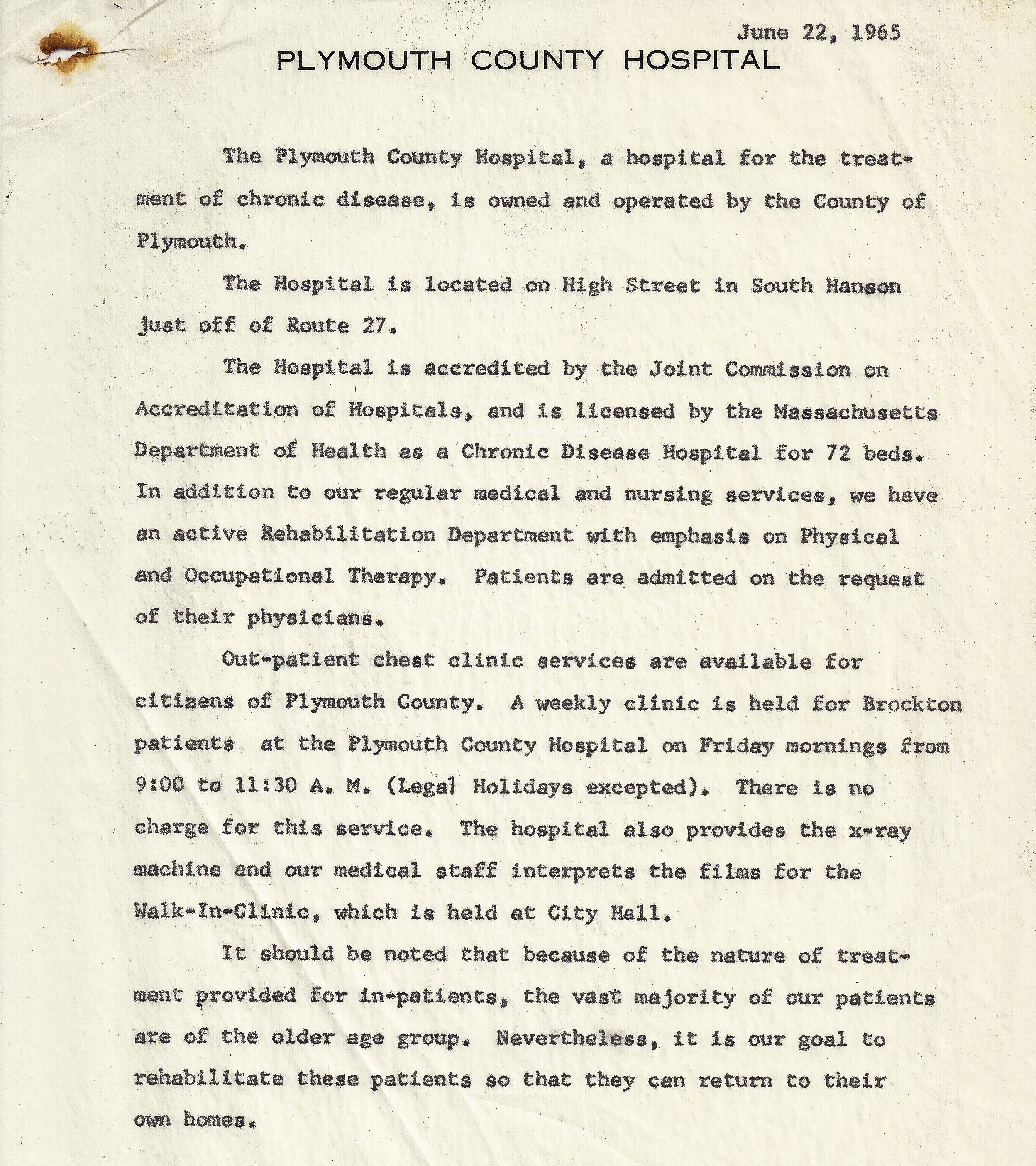
1965 - Released following the transition from a TB sanitarium to a chronic care facility.

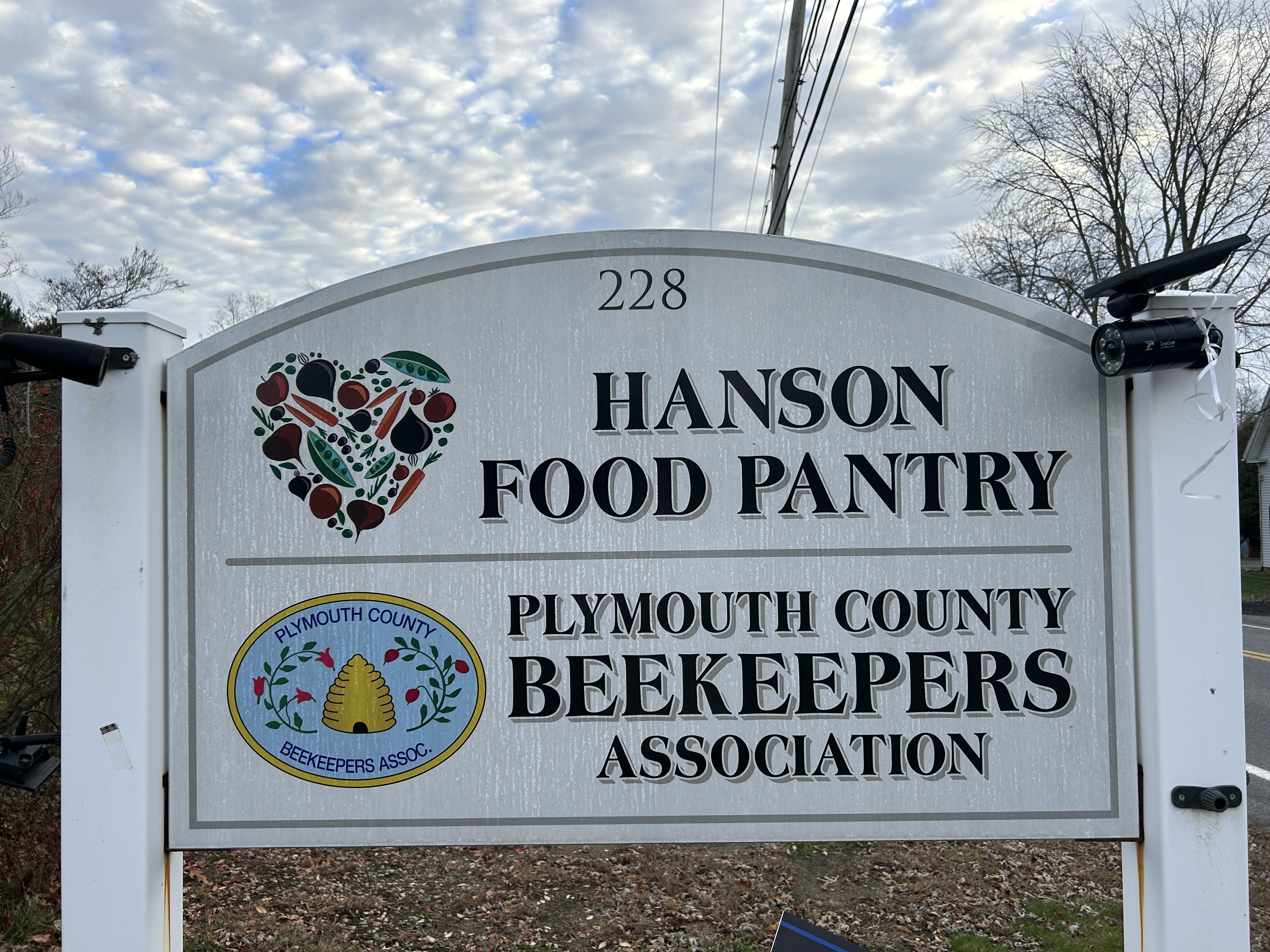
Sign outside the remaining TB hospital annex, 2023.

== See also ==
- Lakeville State Hospital - Nearby state run sanatorium for tuberculosis where adults were sent.
