= Rutland Heights State Hospital =

Hospital in Massachusetts

- Commonwealth of Massachusetts

Geography
- Location: Rutland, Massachusetts, United States
- Coordinates: 42°22′1.96″N 71°57′8.97″W

History
- Former names: Massachusetts Hospital for Consumptives and Tubercular Patients
- Constructed: 1895
- Opened: 1898
- Closed: 1991
- Demolished: 2004

Links
- Lists: Hospitals in Massachusetts

The Rutland Heights State Hospital was a state sanatorium for the treatment of pulmonary tuberculosis located in Rutland, Massachusetts, built for the purpose of treating Tuberculosis patients. The facility was the first state-operated sanatorium in the United States, opening in 1898 and operating for around 93 years before its closure in 1991. Rutland Heights opened under the title “Massachusetts Hospital for Consumptives and Tubercular Patients,” to which it operated until 1900, where it was renamed to “Massachusetts State Sanatorium.” In 1919 it was renamed to “Rutland State Sanatorium,” which was the longest operating name of the hospital, effective until 1963. In 1963, it was renamed briefly to “Rutland Hospital,” and successively in 1965 to “Rutland Heights State Hospital,” which was the final title of the hospital until closing. In 2004, the hospital was demolished.

== Opening and Early History ==
The Massachusetts Hospital for Consumptives and Tubercular Patients was approved for planning and construction on June 5, 1895, by the Massachusetts General Court The hospital was constructed due to the general need for hospital beds for tuberculosis patients and the success of private sanatoriums in the region such as the Sharon Sanatorium in Sharon, Massachusetts. Before the success of the Sharon Sanatorium, experts believed that the cool, damp New England climate was an ill fit for tuberculosis recovery, and that any large-scale institutions devoted to treating tuberculosis patients would be mostly unsuccessful. The initial plans for the sanatorium called for long term care of highly advanced patients; however, this was replaced by a focus on emerging and treatable cases by the time of the sanatorium’s construction. The sanatorium opened on October 3, 1898, making it the first state sanatorium for the treatment of tuberculosis in the USA. The Rutland State Sanatorium hosted state commissions from across the country, as well as visitors from England, Canada, and Korea who toured the sanatorium as a possible model for future facilities.

== Admission and Treatment ==
The Rutland State Sanatorium accepted 21,304 patients within the first 50 years of its operation. The initial focus of the Rutland State Sanatorium was on incipient cases, or cases of tuberculosis which were considered to be early, less severe, and more treatable than more advanced cases. It was for this purpose that the hospital had a team of examiners scattered around Massachusetts, who would examine prospective patients for the progression of tuberculosis. If the patients were in a sufficiently incipient stage of the illness, and they could afford the 4 dollar per week fine, then they were placed on a list of accepted patients to be allowed treatment when beds were made available. This process led to many patients being on a wait list for months at a time, causing some patients to finally be admitted to the sanatorium after their infections had progressed past the point that the examiner approved them for. Only about one-third of all patients admitted to the hospital ended up being in the incipient stage of illness, with the rest of the population being made up of advanced cases, which the hospital was not originally designed for. In 1910, the hospital changed its application process, allowing registered physicians to submit applications for their patients, removing the initial requirement to be able to pay the weekly fee. In 1915 admitted patients were given a trial period of about 1 month, where hospital staff would care for and assess the patient and the progression of tuberculosis in their bodies. This assessment determined if the patient was of suitable progression to continue their admittance, or if they were to be transferred to a different facility. This attempt to raise the number of incipient cases would be effective in the short term, raising the amount by around 6%; however, this would not continue as an increasingly aging population and an increasing focus on more advanced cases of Tuberculosis drove the number of minimally infected cases to below 10% by 1947.

The first decade of operation saw the hospital focus on the benefits of fresh air and exercise as means to treat Tuberculosis. Patients were instructed to participate in moderate exercise out in the open air, with intermittent periods of rest. Patients were additionally fed large amounts of food, anywhere from 3,500 to 5,000 calories per day. In 1917, the standard procedure was changed to involve primarily bed rest, with patients requiring special permission to perform any sort of strenuous activity. The process of overfeeding was also changed, with patients receiving an average of 2,300 calories per day; this change led to patients putting on weight easier, as well as complaining less about stomach issues. In 1911, the hospital would begin to use its most prevalent treatment, medically induced pneumothorax. Pneumothorax was initially used only on the most severe cases, where bedrest alone was deemed insufficient for the patient’s well being. In 1927, pneumothorax treatments were carried out on a more regular basis, to the point where almost 40% of patients in the hospital were administered pneumothorax treatment, with a successful improvement rate of 70% after the procedure. Other procedures such as thoracoplasties, bronchoscopies, and in rare cases surgeries were carried out, when needed, though they were not as common as pneumothorax.

== Late History ==
After the first 50 years of operation as a sanatorium, the Rutland State Sanatorium saw a dip in academic medical literature surrounding the activities of the hospital. At some point between the 1950s and early 1960s, likely in 1963 with the change in name to “Rutland Hospital”, the hospital underwent a change away from the focus on tuberculosis to offering other chronic care programs. One such program was a program for treating patients with alcohol addictions, which involved patients staying at the hospital for extended periods of time, receiving medication and counseling in attempts to treat their addiction.

== Closure ==
In June 1991, a state report regarding the consolidation of state resources for public health institutions was released. This report called for the closure of the Rutland Heights Hospital, as well as 2 other state chronic care hospitals. The hospitals were closed to save the state money in the middle of an economic crisis, as well as to consolidate state resources and reduce redundancy in the healthcare system. The hospital closed that November, 1991.
