= Pondville State Hospital =

Hospital in Massachusetts

- Commonwealth of Massachusetts

Geography
- Location: Norfolk, Massachusetts, United States
- Coordinates: 42.096969°N 71.288766°W

History
- Opened: 1927
- Closed: 1981

Links
- Lists: Hospitals in Massachusetts

Pondville State Hospital was a hospital in Norfolk, Massachusetts. The facility opened in 1927 as a state-operated hospital to treat cancer patients and do research on the prevention and cure of cancer. It was located in buildings of the former Norfolk State Hospital, which served the mentally ill and drug-addicted from 1914 to 1919. Pondville provided surgical services, residency training, training for Licensed Practical Nurses (from 1949), and outpatient care. From the 1920s to the 1960s, facilities included on-site housing for many employees in separate multi-unit "cottages". New hospital buildings were constructed in the 1960s but as the state deemphasized direct patient care, it was agreed to sell the facility to the privately owned Norwood Hospital in 1981, and renamed Southwood Hospital. The facility was abandoned in 2003.
