= American Addiction Centers =

American healthcare facilities and services company

American Addiction Centers Inc.
- Type: Private
- Industry: Healthcare
- Founded: 2004
- Headquarters: Brentwood, Tennessee, U.S.
- Area served: United States
- Key people: Andrew McWilliams (CEO); Dr. Lawrence Weinstein (CMO)

American Addiction Centers (AAC) is a Brentwood, Tennessee–based, publicly traded for-profit addiction treatment chain.

The company delivers addiction treatment services in residential and outpatient facilities, as well as provides drug testing and diagnostic laboratory services. Andrew McWilliams is the current CEO of AAC and Mark Calarco is the CEO of its laboratory division.

== History ==
American Addiction Centers was co-founded in 2004 by Michael Cartwright (then CEO). In October 2014, the company went from privately held to public, becoming the first publicly traded addiction treatment provider in the U.S.

In December 2014, American Addiction Centers made its first acquisition as a public company, taking over Recovery First Inc., a Florida-based substance use disorder and rehab services company. By 2015, American Addiction Centers ran 8 facilities in 6 states after acquiring several sites in California, New Jersey, Rhode Island and Mississippi. Among the company's acquisitions in 2015 were also two digital marketing firms focused on publishing online content on substance use disorders – Referral Solutions Group and Taj Media; and Aliso Viejo–based Laguna Treatment Hospital's building for $13.5 million.

In 2015, the company launched a Behavioral Health Academic Scholarship Program, providing scholarship funds to college students pursuing careers in addiction-related fields.

In 2017, AAC acquired AdCare, a New England–based provider of addiction treatment, for $85 million.

In 2019, AAC received three warnings from the New York Stock Exchange, risking being delisted. The third warning was issued after AAC stock traded below $1 for at least 30 trading days.

During the COVID-19 pandemic, AAC provided coronavirus testing for its patients and the local Tennessee community through its in-house lab to prevent infections. It also launched telehealth services on its mobile application and monitored the vitals of an in-house patient through their EarlySense technology and toxicology testing as a part of their ongoing treatment program. In late 2020, the company underwent a financial restructuring. In June 2020, it sought Chapter 11 bankruptcy protection.

== Locations ==
By 2018, American Addiction Centers was operating 12 residential treatment centers and 18 outpatient facilities, and reported a revenue of almost $296 million.

As of December 2020, AAC operates 26 locations in eight states of the U.S.

In June 2023, Sunrise House was closed.

== Research ==
American Addiction Centers conducts studies and research through its subsidiaries. In 2018, the center conducted patient outcome studies with Centerstone Research Institute. In 2020, they conducted a study on people's alcohol consumption pattern during the COVID-19 pandemic, and a research on substance use disorder likelihood in the LGBTQ+ community. The company also conducted other alcohol-related surveys and studies during the pandemic.

== Controversy ==
In 2018, a California jury issued a verdict against AAC, awarding $7 million to the family of a patient who committed suicide in a AAC facility and died 20 hours after his arrival.

According to an investigation by Mother Jones, centers managed by AAC often leave patients unattended, which led to some patient deaths and lawsuits. AAC denies it and claims that its death rate is the lowest in the industry.

In May 2019, AAC filed a defamation lawsuit against the National Association of Addiction Treatment Providers (NAATP). The lawsuit was dismissed in late 2021.

In January 2025, AAC was faced with a class action lawsuit for allegedly violating HIPAA after experiencing a cyberattack where personal and health information was accessed. In November 2025, AAC reached a $2.75 million settlement.
