= Paul A. Dever State School =

Paul A Dever State School
- Massachusetts Department of Mental Retardation

Geography
- Location: Taunton, Massachusetts, Massachusetts, United States
- Coordinates: 41°56′38.26″N 71°7′17.40″W

Services
- Beds: 1,400

History
- Founded: 1952
- Closed: 2002

The Paul A. Dever State School, also known as the Myles Standish School for the Mentally Retarded, is a former state school located in Taunton, Massachusetts, at the former site of Camp Myles Standish. It was turned into a school for the mentally disabled in 1959. At this time, the name was changed to the Paul A. Dever State School, after the Governor of the Commonwealth of Massachusetts from 1949–1953, Paul A. Dever.

== History ==
The campus is about 1,200 acres (4.9 km^{2}) and originally consists of 15 L-Shaped dormitory buildings connected by about 1.5 miles (2.4 km) of tunnels along with recreational sites. Additionally, a centrally located kitchen was also built with other structures. Much of the facility closed in 1991 due to lawsuits over funding, with the entire facility closing in 2002. About 45 buildings were still standing as of end-2012, but the city started tearing down much of the premises and there are only about 10 buildings left in mid-2015, most of which are in heavily deteriorated state. The building is often used for police training, which is the cause of paintball splatters inside.

== Recent Activity ==
- April 15, 2009-Four of six suspected teens were arraigned in Taunton District Court for being accused of setting fires to Dever on January 2, 2009. “The incident occurred just before 8 p.m. at an abandoned residential building. A security officer reported a fire at the two-story structure commonly known as House #32, and it was quickly extinguished upon the arrival of Taunton fire personnel." The teens were expected to have been back in court May 20 for a pretrial hearing.
- November 27, 2009-There were more suspicions of arson on Dever’s grounds when a few fires had broken out and completely destroyed one of the buildings. “The Dever school property contains a number of empty buildings that through the years have either been vandalized or set afire by arsonists.” The interior markings inside one building even suggest that it was home to a paintball game a short time after its abandonment.
- December 13, 2009-Another fire had broken out. "The latest fire was reported at 9:30 p.m. and caused minor damage to an empty one-story building, according to Deputy Fire Chief Michael Sylvia — who also said that the blaze originated in the front entry area of what years ago was known as a Brigadier’s Quarters.", the arsonist got away on what authorities said was a dirt bike.

September 2012- Another fire had broken out.

- May 27, 2013 - Major fire (3-alarm equivalent) http://www.myfoxboston.com/story/22429979/2013/05/27/fire-breaks-out-in-taunton
- September 9, 2015 - Majority of the building have been torn down, 10 or less remaining now. Construction has begun on new warehouses.
- October 1, 2015 - The School has been mostly demolished and is being used for an expansion of the Miles Standish industrial park, one of the most profitable industrial parks in Massachusetts.
- As of late 2016, none of the abandoned buildings remain.

One of the L-shaped buildings of Paul A Dever state school at night in 2014.

== See also ==
- Camp Myles Standish
- Paul A. Dever
