= Lakeville Hospital =

- Massachusetts
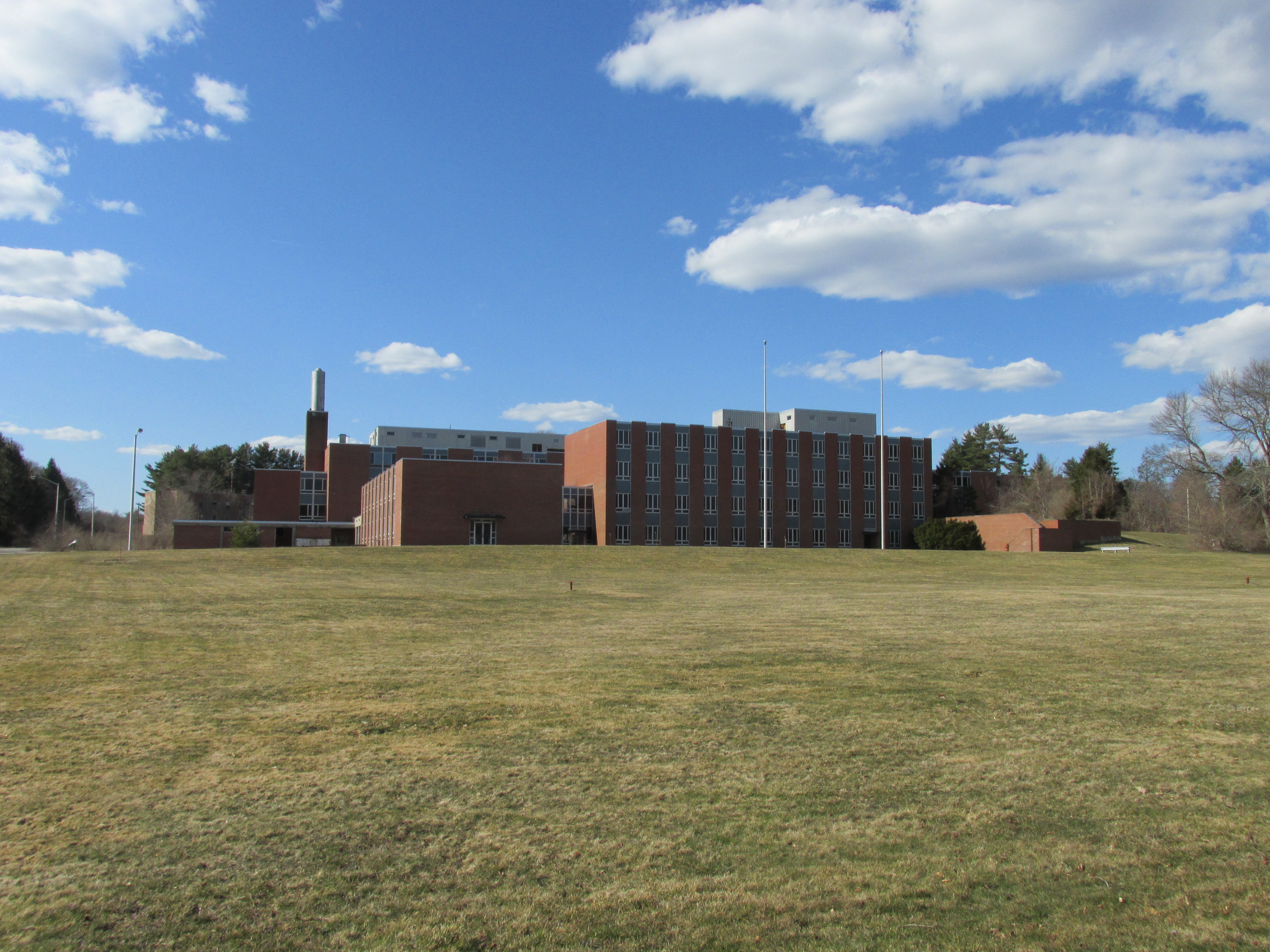
- Former Lakeville State Hospital

Geography
- Location: Lakeville, Plymouth County, Massachusetts, United States
- Coordinates: 41°52′34.42″N 70°55′39.62″W

Organization
- Type: Sanatorium hospital

History
- Constructed: 1907
- Opened: 1910
- Closed: 1992

Links
- Lists: Hospitals in Massachusetts

Lakeville Hospital, also known as the Lakeville State Sanatorium, was a state-operated sanatorium in Lakeville, Massachusetts. The sanatorium opened its doors in 1910 for the treatment of those with tuberculosis. In the 1950s, following a decline in the number of tuberculosis cases, the sanatorium began treating patients with other crippling conditions. In 1963, the Lakeville State Sanatorium was renamed the Lakeville Hospital. Pursuant to recommendation by the Special Commission for the study of the Consolidation of State Facilities, the hospital was closed in 1993. The hospital and surrounding area is secured to prevent unauthorized entry.

== Ownership by National Development ==
In 2002, the 73-acre hospital site, valued at $5.1 million, was purchased at auction. The owner planned and acquired permits for a large-scale mixed-use development which would include a Stop & Shop, Target, Chili's Restaurant, 100-unit senior housing complex, and office park. The project was terminated when the development team experienced difficulties securing water and sewer service to the site. Lakeville currently receives $52,000 annually in real estate taxes from the unoccupied property.

== Proposed ownership by Sysco ==
In 2010 Sysco, one of the largest food service companies in the country, publicly expressed interest in relocating their Norton-based Massachusetts distribution center to Lakeville. The site of the former Lakeville Hospital was identified as a possible location, despite the fact the site was zoned for mixed-use and not industrial purposes.

A special town meeting was held on June 6, 2010 to approve or reject tax increment financing (TIF) for Sysco. Lakeville voters approved the TIF proposal 396 to 140, enabling the proposed development of a $110 million 650,000 square-foot food distribution center to move forward. The TIF gave Sysco a 13-year progressively smaller tax break, totaling 43 percent of its potential real estate tax liability. It also allowed Sysco to receive state tax breaks. In exchange, Lakeville would collect significant taxes over that period, including annual payments of $130,000 in excise taxes and $1 million over the next two years for permits necessary to do the project.

Following the town's approval of the TIF, the planning board drafted a proposal for an Industrial Overlay District at the request of Sysco and the encouragement of the town counsel. The Industrial Overlay District was intended preserve underlying zoning districts and eliminate the need for Sysco to apply for zoning variances that, if granted, could be appealed.

Public hearings on the matter of rezoning the site from mixed-use to industrial were held on September 14, 2010 and September 21, 2010. The town planning board, following these meetings, approved bringing the zoning change before voters at a special town meeting. A special town meeting was held on October 18, 2010, in which Sysco's proposals were defeated.
