= Steward Health Care =

US-based for-profit healthcare system

Steward Health Care System, LLC
- Type: Private
- Industry: Healthcare
- Predecessor: Caritas Christi Health Care
- Founded: 2010; 16 years ago in Boston, Massachusetts, United States
- Founder: Ralph de la Torre
- Defunct: May 6, 2024; 2 years ago
- Fate: Bankrupt
- Headquarters: 1900 Pearl, Dallas, Texas, United States
- Number of locations: 31 hospitals (2023)
- Areas served: United States; Colombia; Saudi Arabia; United Arab Emirates
- Key people: Ralph de la Torre (Former CEO); Mark Rich (Former President)
- Services: Healthcare; Health insurance; Primary Care
- Revenue: $9,000,000,000 (2024)
- Operating income: $(381,304,000) (2020)
- Net income: $(407,593,000) (2020)
- Total assets: $3,294,985,000 (2020)
- Owner: Steward Physicians (90%); Medical Properties Trust (10%)
- Number of employees: 30,000 (2024)
- Parent: Steward Healthcare Investors LLC
- Divisions: Steward Hospital Holdings; Steward Medical Group; Steward Healthcare Network; TRACO International Group

Steward Health Care was a large private for-profit health system headquartered in Dallas, Texas. It utilized an integrated care model to deliver healthcare across its hospitals and primary care locations, as well as through its managed care and health insurance services. At the start of 2024, Steward operated 33 hospitals and employed 33,000 people in the United States, however that number decreased significantly due to the company's May 2024 bankruptcy filing. Steward's international ventures included Steward Colombia, which operates four hospitals, and Steward Middle East, which operates in Saudi Arabia and the United Arab Emirates.

At its height, Steward was the largest private hospital system in the U.S., with 37 hospitals consisting of almost 8,000 inpatient beds, over 25 urgent care centers, 42 skilled nursing facilities, and a large physician network, in total employing about 42,000 people across the United States and Malta.

Steward began in 2010 in Massachusetts, when private equity firm Cerberus Capital Management acquired the failing non-profit Caritas Christi Health Care system. This move was led by Caritas CEO Ralph de la Torre, MD, a former cardiac surgeon who became founder and CEO of the new system, a position from which he resigned on October 1, 2024. Steward mainly operates in the United States, with locations across the country. Since 2016, Steward has fueled its national expansion with debt-driven mergers and acquisitions, largely financed through sale-leaseback deals with its principal landlord, Medical Properties Trust (MPT), in which Steward purchases hospitals and immediately sells the real estate to MPT in order to recoup costs, pay investors, and fuel further expansion, in turn entering into triple-net lease agreements with MPT to be paid by the hospitals.

Cerberus, having made a profit of about $800 million over 10 years, made its exit in 2020 by giving its shares in Steward to a group of Steward physicians led by de la Torre in exchange for a convertible bond worth $350 million. Steward is owned by said physicians (90%) and MPT (10%). While Steward says that selling and leasing their hospital properties (a practice they call "asset light") allows them to prioritize patient care, experts have described it as a contributing factor to the system's later financial difficulties and resulting patient care and safety concerns. Following months of reported financial issues and billions in unpaid bills, Steward filed for Chapter 11 bankruptcy on May 6, 2024.

Internationally, Steward is known for its role at the center of a corruption scandal in Malta, the result of a nullified public–private partnership to run and improve several of the island nation's public hospitals which has led to criminal charges against multiple former Maltese government officials. In May 2024, Maltese authorities recommended charges against CEO Ralph de la Torre and multiple other Steward executives in relation to accusations of bribery, misappropriation, and money laundering. Separately, Steward International opened two hospitals in Colombia and performed consulting work in the Middle East with a plan to build a hospital in Saudi Arabia. However, following its Chapter 11 bankruptcy filing in May 2024, Steward Health Care and its international subsidiaries were completely liquidated, resulting in the permanent closure or rebranding of all corporate operations and hospital facilities under new ownership.

== History ==
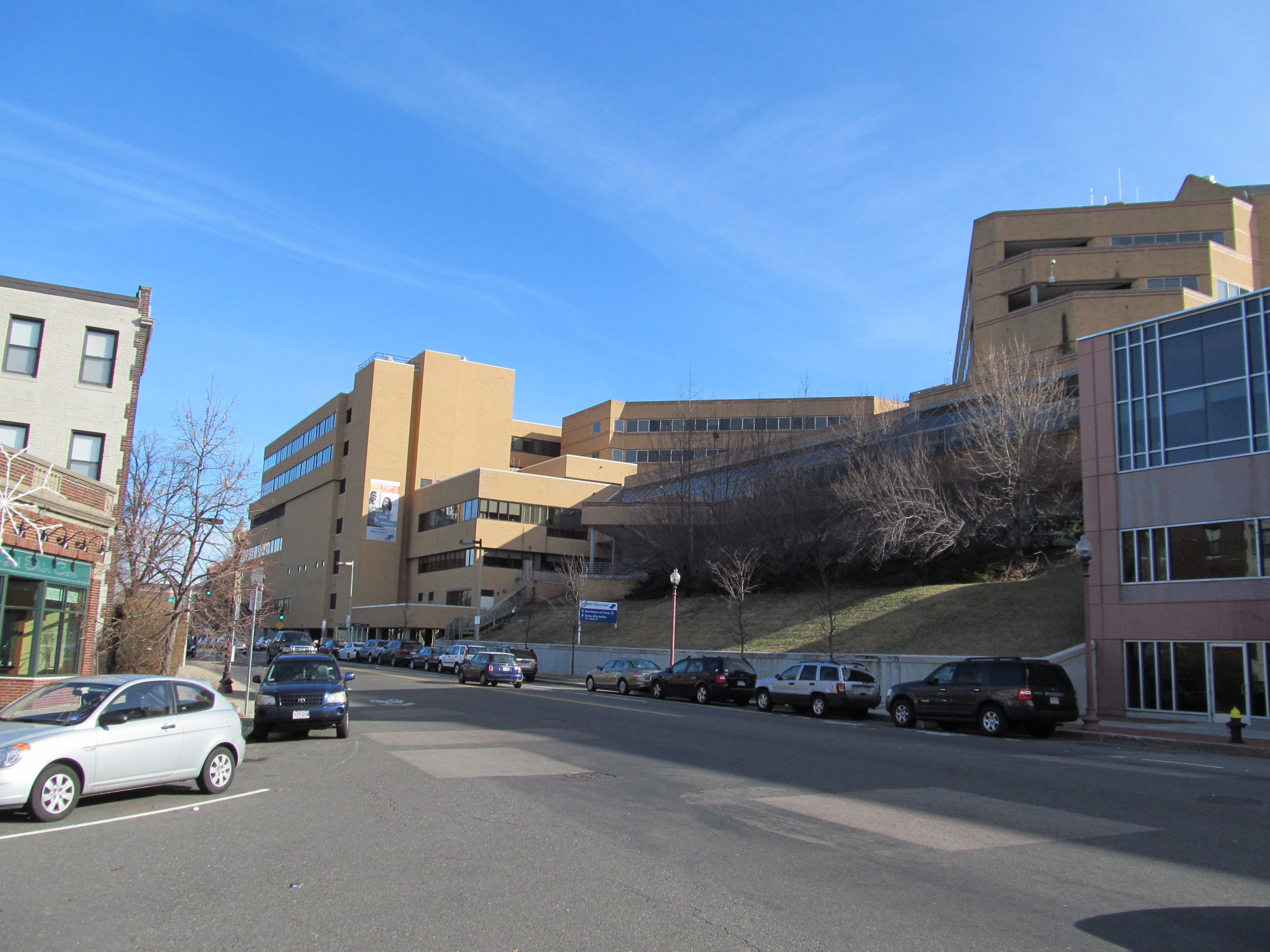
St. Elizabeth's Medical Center in Brighton, MA, which served as Steward's flagship hospital until it was sold in 2024

Steward Health Care was founded in 2010, when Caritas Christi Health Care was sold to New York private equity firm Cerberus Capital Management, with Caritas CEO and former Beth Israel Deaconess Medical Center heart surgeon Ralph de la Torre continuing as CEO of the new company.

=== Pre-Steward ===
Caritas Christi Health Care, founded in 1985 under the ownership of the Archdiocese of Boston, was a non-profit healthcare system comprising six Eastern Massachusetts hospitals as well as a number of non-acute healthcare facilities across southern New England. Rife with financial difficulties for years, the Archdiocese had been in the process of trying to sell the health system, most recently to Catholic health system Ascension in a bid that fell through in mid-2007. Following these failed attempts, Massachusetts Attorney General Martha Coakley commissioned a report from an outside agency to review Caritas' finances and make recommendations for its future. This report, published in March 2008, made several recommendations, including that the Archdiocese cede control of the system to an independent board of directors, retaining control only over religious matters. According to Coakley, the complexity of operating a hospital system had, at that point in time, led "virtually all religious organizations throughout the nation to transfer control to lay boards."

With the Archdiocese's agreement, an independent board was created. Still, Caritas did not have a CEO—its previous CEO had resigned in 2006 amid allegations of misconduct. The new board then began searching for a new leader for the system. That year, cardiac surgeon Ralph de la Torre, who just the previous year founded and became CEO of Beth Israel Deaconess Medical Center's Cardiovascular Institute, began seeking opportunities to lead a hospital. Connecting with the Archdiocese through Jack Connors, a mutual acquaintance, de la Torre met with the Caritas board of directors and was chosen to be their new CEO. Spending his first year at Caritas restructuring the system, de la Torre saw the system turn from a loss of $20 million in 2008 to an income of $31 million in 2009, despite the 2008 financial crisis. Despite the short-term success, de la Torre believed Caritas' long-term prospects depended on a significant cash infusion—particularly to preserve jobs and fund the system's pension plan, which was uninsured and had been frozen due to lack of contributions by Caritas.

Coinciding with de la Torre's revamp of Caritas, 2009 saw private equity firms begin to show increased interest in healthcare investments in anticipation of passage of the Affordable Care Act (ACA). Firms saw the potential for increased profits given both the expected increase in demand for hospital services by newly insured patients and the ACA's switch from fee-for-service (in which providers are paid per individual service) to capitated and bundled payment models (in which providers are paid a flat fee, often per patient, regardless of care provided). These new models aimed to rectify fee-for-service's unintended incentivization for providers to perform or recommend procedures or services which may not have been medically necessary in order to increase income. Intended to control costs and increase quality of care, the new payment models further provided private equity firms and other investment groups with opportunities to maximize returns through strategies such as cutting costs and taking on more patients.

De la Torre sought one of these firms as a potential investor, and in 2009 met with Robert Nardelli, an executive at Cerberus and former CEO of Chrysler and Home Depot. Nardelli was impressed with de la Torre's energy and expertise, describing him as having a "tremendous edge." The conversation led to a formal proposition for Cerberus to purchase Caritas and convert the system to for-profit.

Prior to finalization, the transaction required approval from the state Attorney General—mandated by state law for any changes in tax status from non-profit to for-profit. AG Coakley approved the deal with four main stipulations, requiring that Cerberus:

- pay off Caritas' debt of approximately $275 million and assume liability for the system's full pension valued at about $200 million
- invest $400 million in capital expenditures
- maintain majority ownership and not close or sell any hospitals for 3–5 years
- not take on debt for the purpose of dividends

Cerberus agreed to these stipulations, which brought the overall cost of the deal to $895 million.

In addition, Steward entered into a binding contract with the Archdiocese, named the "Stewardship Agreement," requiring that Steward employ a vice president for Mission and maintain at each hospital an ethics committee in order to ensure the Caritas hospitals maintained Catholic identity. The agreement stipulated that in the event that Steward or the Archdiocese terminate the agreement, by their own discretion or by sale, closure, or transfer of the hospitals, Steward must remove all "symbols of Catholic identity," return all religious items to the Archdiocese, and make a $25 million donation to a Massachusetts charity designated by the Archdiocese. This agreement would not apply to any future facilities acquired outside of the original Caritas organization.

Being an outlier in a state known for non-profit healthcare, Steward was a controversial company from the beginning. De la Torre was regarded by many early on as an ambitious and highly influential figure in healthcare, having goals of building the company on a national level. He stood out as one of the few people willing to invest millions into the system's troubled hospitals, which mostly serve low-income populations who would struggle to access healthcare without them. However, three years later, Steward was reported to be continuing to lose money and multiple attempts to expand outside of Massachusetts had failed. While Steward would eventually achieve its goal of expanding to other states, the first several years focused on in-state growth.

=== 2010–2015: First acquisitions and closures ===
In September 2011, AG Coakley approved Steward's acquisition of Morton Hospital in Taunton and Quincy Medical Center, both of which were previously non-profit facilities at risk of closing due to financial struggles. The deal required, among other commitments, that both facilities stay open for at least 10 years.

In November 2011, Steward took its first step into the type of sale-leaseback deals that would partially define its long-running business model when it put 11 of its medical office buildings up for sale with the intent of leasing the properties for continued use. Consistent with earlier deals with the state, Steward reported that all proceeds would go to hospital operations. Steward justified the sale by claiming that being a landlord to its own physicians created compliance issues, as well as stating that "we’re not a real estate company. Our focus is on running hospitals and taking care of our patients." Thirteen properties were ultimately sold to Healthcare Trust of America, a real estate investment trust, the next year for $100 million. The triple-net lease entered into by Steward would see doctors and hospitals pay rent for the buildings while still being responsible for property insurance, taxes, and maintenance.

Despite the 2011 agreement to keep Quincy Medical Center open, Steward announced in November 2014 that the hospital would close by the end of the year. Steward cited operating losses mostly attributed to a surplus in patient beds in the region, coupled with patients being referred more often to nearby South Shore Hospital in Weymouth and Beth Israel Deaconess Hospital – Milton. The next month, Steward and the state Department of Public Health reached a deal to keep the hospital's emergency department open until the end of 2015. The emergency room ultimately stayed open until November 2020, almost five years longer than planned.

Operations at Steward's Carney Hospital in Dorchester appeared to benefit from Quincy Medical Center's closure, seeing 125 QMC employees transfer to Carney, including several physicians. Steward reported a 16 percent increase in admissions and a 21 percent increase in outpatient visits in 2015, and new hospital president Walter J. Ramos said the hospital was expecting to break even by the end of the year following several years of losses.

=== 2015–2020: Investment and national growth ===
The year 2015 ended in a milestone for Steward, as they saw their first-ever profitable year, attributed to a significant drop in expenses. It also marked the end of the Attorney General's 5-year monitoring period, allowing Steward to become more flexible with spending, use of debt, and facility operations.

In September 2016, Steward and Cerberus entered a $1.25 billion deal with real estate investment trust Medical Properties Trust, in which MPT would purchase all of Steward's hospital properties for $1.2 billion and pay an additional $50 million for a 5 percent stake in the company. In return, Steward would lease the properties back from MPT. This influx of money would allow Steward to pay back the entirety of Cerberus' initial 2010 investment while the firm would remain a majority owner, in addition to allowing the company to pay back all of its $400 million in debt. Steward and Cerberus were further able to provide hundreds of millions of dollars in dividends to investors from this sale, including to de la Torre, and fund a massive national expansion. The deal became final in September 2017, and would mark the acceleration of the company's strategy of funding further expansions by selling purchased facilities' real estate to MPT. This strategy has widely been labeled as a significant factor in the system's later financial difficulties. Studies noted that while a large portion of the proceeds from the sales went toward expansion and investor dividends, the hospitals themselves received little from the sales and were left responsible for lease payments with built-in escalator clauses which saw rent payments increase annually. In correspondence with The Boston Globe in 2024, de la Torre and Cerberus both distanced themselves from responsibility for the deals with MPT, each pointing to the other as the driving force behind the deals.

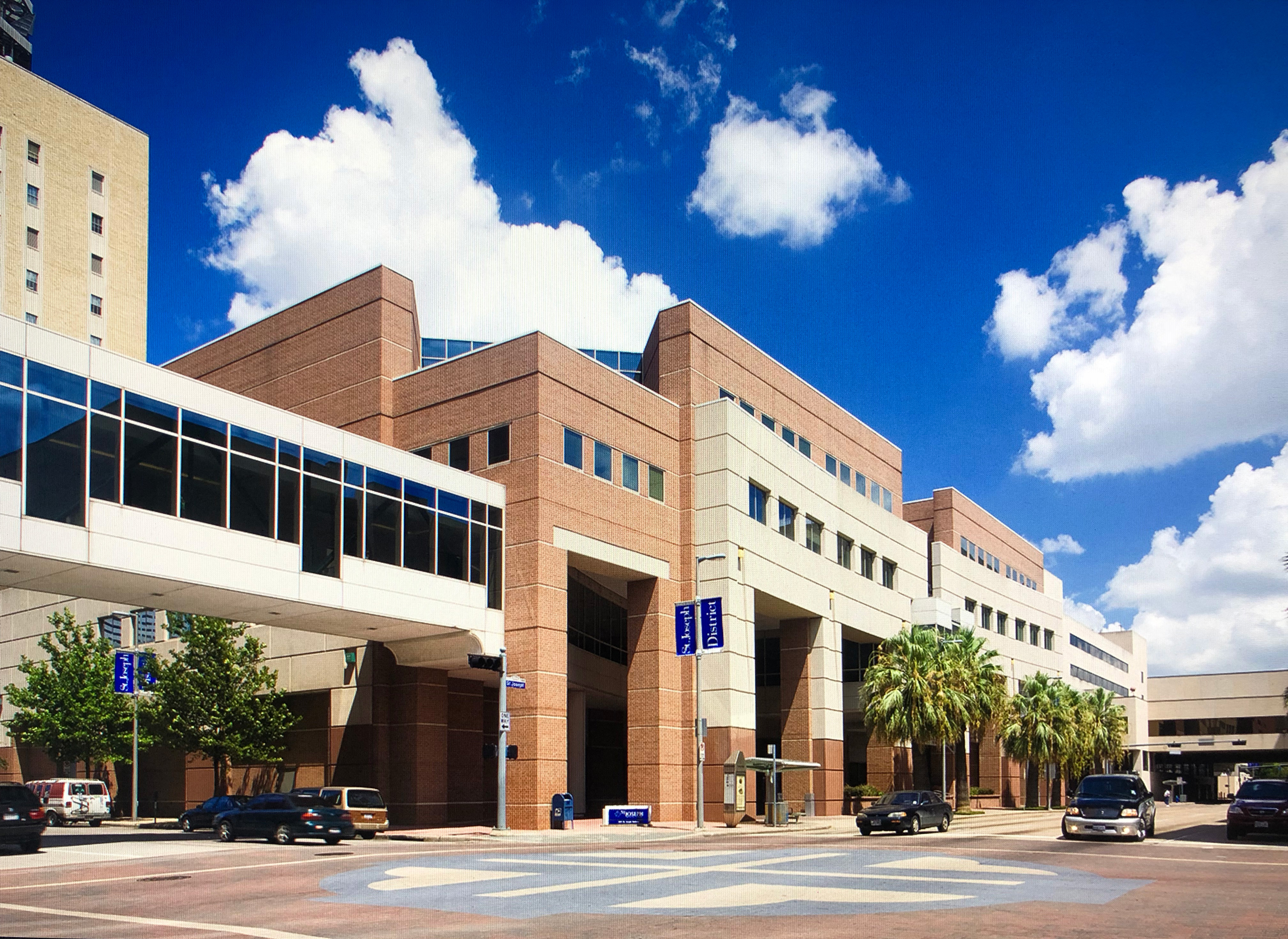
St. Joseph Medical Center in Houston, TX, which Steward acquired from Iasis Healthcare in 2017

2017 saw Steward finally expand beyond Massachusetts' borders, with the purchase in February of eight hospitals from Tennessee-based Community Health Systems across Ohio, Pennsylvania and Florida, and the later acquisition in May of Tennessee-based Iasis Healthcare, which added 18 hospitals in Utah, Arizona, Texas, Louisiana, Arkansas, Colorado, Florida and Nevada. The latter deal brought Steward's network up to 36 hospitals with estimated revenues of $8 billion, making it the largest private for-profit hospital operator in the United States at the time. 2017 also saw Steward expand internationally with their takeover of a multi-billion-dollar contract to operate and renovate struggling hospitals in Malta.

In February 2018, Steward announced that its top management would move to Dallas, Texas from Boston.

=== 2020–2024: Decline & bankruptcy ===
In June 2020, Cerberus exited the picture when Steward physicians, led by Steward founder del la Torre, acquired a 90 percent controlling stake in the company by buying out Cerberus' ownership. The group of physicians was able to do this after borrowing $335 million from Medical Properties Trust, which retained 10 percent of the company. Over the course of its ownership, Cerberus made a profit of $800 million. The next year, MPT entered into a joint venture with Australian firm Macquarie Infrastructure Partners, selling 50% interest in its ownership of Steward's Massachusetts real estate to Macquarie and taking out a mortgage with Apollo Global Management.

In 2021, Steward issued a dividend of $111 million to its investors. De la Torre received $81.5 million of the dividend.

Later that year, Steward paid $1.1 billion to purchase five hospitals in Miami from Tenet Healthcare.

==== Downsizing & reports of financial hardship ====
The year 2023 saw Steward begin to downsize. Following a failed attempt in 2021 to sell its Utah hospitals to HCA Healthcare, abandoned after the Federal Trade Commission filed an antitrust lawsuit, Steward successfully sold its statewide operation to CommonSpirit Health. This deal included "five hospitals, over 35 medical group clinics, imaging and urgent care centers, and other outpatient ventures." Steward also closed Texas Vista Medical Center, citing low reimbursement rates and 25 percent of patients not paying their bills (CBS News also reported that Texas Vista owed more than $650,000 to various vendors), and announced the 2024 closure of New England Sinai Hospital, reporting operating losses of $22 million.

In January 2024, an investigation by The Boston Globe revealed that Steward was facing significant financial difficulties, creating fears of possible hospital closures. Part of this stemmed from a press release from Medical Properties Trust announcing that Steward owed MPT $50 million in unpaid rent on their properties, in addition to owing several contractors and vendors for unpaid services and equipment. MPT, after multiple months of partial rent payments from Steward, brought on financial and legal firms to come up with a plan to collect what Steward owed. The result was an action plan designed, according to MPT, to "strengthen Steward’s liquidity and restore its balance sheet, optimize MPT’s ability to recover unpaid rent, and ultimately reduce MPT’s exposure to Steward." Steward agreed to pursue the sale of some hospital operations and to divest from non-core operations, in exchange for receiving a bridge loan from MPT in the amount of $60 million and MPT writing off portions of Steward's unpaid rent. Of the agreement, MPT said "There can be no assurance that Steward will successfully execute its plans or that the Company will recover all of its deferred rent and loans outstanding to Steward." In February, U.S. House Representative Stephen Lynch said after a meeting with Steward that the health care system was looking to sell four of its nine Massachusetts hospitals "as soon as possible," including St. Elizabeth's Medical Center in Brighton, Holy Family Hospital's two campuses in Haverhill and Methuen, Nashoba Valley Medical Center in Ayer, and Norwood Hospital, whose reconstruction would also be halted.

The repossession by vendors of medical equipment for unpaid bills was linked to the death of a new mother at Saint Elizabeth's Medical Center in Brighton, Massachusetts, who in October 2023 suffered a liver bleed which staff were unable to treat due to the lack of equipment. She was then transferred to another hospital, where she later died. Steward, regarding the incident at St. Elizabeth's, said in part that "understanding that the demand for supplies and staff can fluctuate at any given moment due to changing and unpredictable volumes of patients, Steward is confident we have adequate supplies for our physicians, providers, and health care professionals to continue providing high-quality care to our patients." In its ensuing investigation, the Massachusetts Department of Health found that the hospital had little control over what vendors were paid and when:

During its investigation, DPH became aware from St. Elizabeth's president that the non-payment of the coils was in part due to the hospital's lack of control over its funds and authorization to make payments to its vendors. [...] According to the president, the hospital's corporate office determined which vendors to pay and made the payments (or not).

— Informational Brief of the Commonwealth of Massachusetts in Support of Responses to the Debtors' Emergency Motions, United States Bankruptcy Court for the Southern District of Texas Houston Division

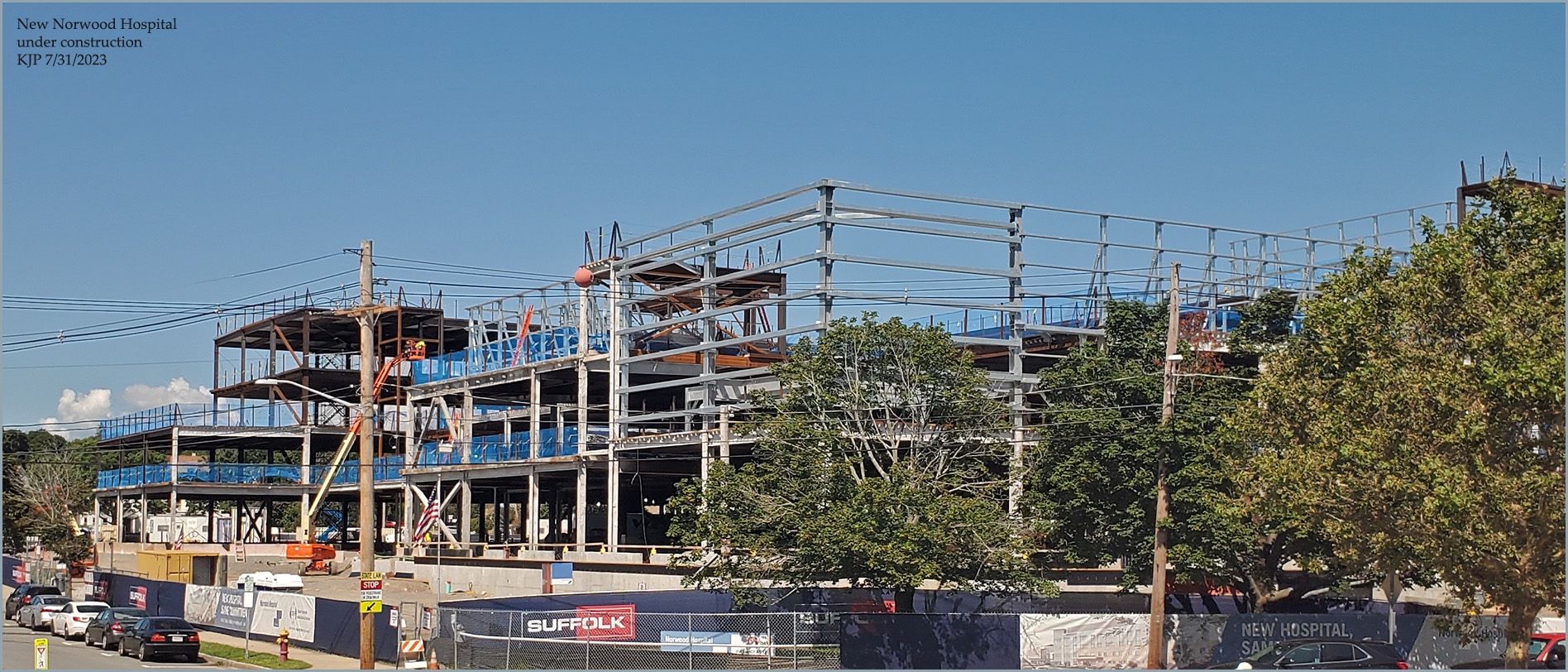
Norwood Hospital mid-construction

Unpaid bills also led to work stoppages in multiple construction projects. In Texarkana, Texas, construction started in 2021 on a $227 million project to replace Steward's Wadley Regional Medical Center with a new campus 5 miles north of the current location. On February 5, construction firm Robins & Morton sent a memo to subcontractors stating they had "requested evidence of [Steward] having made financial arrangements that will allow them to fulfill their payment obligations under the contract." Having not received proper evidence of financing, the firm ordered subcontractors to halt all work on the site. Similarly in Norwood, Massachusetts, construction to replace Norwood Hospital, which was fully evacuated and subsequently demolished due to damage from flooding caused by an intense 2020 rainstorm, was stopped due to nonpayment.

On February 2, 2024, Steward announced to employees that they had agreed to a "significant financial transaction" that would allow their Massachusetts hospitals to continue operations while they continued to explore options for selling some facilities to other operators. The terms of the deal and the source of the funding were not immediately disclosed, however later reporting indicated that the system refinanced its debt with a $600 million loan in 2023 and received a bridge loan of $150 million in January, the two loans coming from a group of asset management firms including Sound Point Capital Management, Oaktree Capital Management, WhiteHawk Capital Partners, Owl Creek Asset Management, MidOcean Partners, and Brigade Capital. Terms of the loan required that Steward present by April 30 a plan to begin paying its debts and emerge as a sustainable company.

In late March 2024, Steward announced a preliminary agreement made to sell its physician network Stewardship Health to Optum, a subsidiary of UnitedHealth Group and already the largest employer of physicians in the United States. Optum pulled out of the agreement in June. Though their reasoning was not immediately clear, the proposed deal had been the subject of legislators' calls for thorough regulatory review.

On May 3, 2024, with no word from Steward regarding whether it met its April 30 forbearance deadline, the Massachusetts Executive Office of Health and Human Services (EOHHS) announced the activation of the Incident Command System to prepare for anticipated disruptions in health care access across the state.

Massachusetts lawmakers reacting to emerging news all but committed to ruling out a bailout, stating that the system had already received $54 million in previous years in the form of COVID-19 relief aid. Also contributing to lawmakers' stance on the issue was Steward's repeated refusal to provide financial reports to the state, a requirement of all hospitals under state law and one which Steward has been battling the state over for years—which was cited as a reason they were provided significantly less American Rescue Plan Act money in the third round of this aid. Medical Properties Trust, in a February Securities and Exchange Commission report, reported operating losses of $664 million for the fourth quarter of 2023, specifically noting $772 million in "write-offs and impairments" which they attributed primarily to Steward. Further, MPT deferred collection of full rent payments until June. In addition, conditions of Steward's January 2024 bridge loan required that the company demonstrate an ability to begin paying its debts by April 30, the end of their forbearance period. While Steward in February said that it has a plan to come out of the forbearance period as a sustainable company, economic experts, specifically ones who have studied Steward for years, expressed doubt that the system would be able to achieve this given the amount of debt and further predicted that bankruptcy was likely. While the proposed sale of its physician network would be expected to provide a significant windfall, it was not expected that a sale would be approved in a short enough timeframe to avoid bankruptcy.

==== Chapter 11 bankruptcy ====
On May 5, 2024, The Wall Street Journal reported that Steward Health Care was expected to file for Chapter 11 bankruptcy protection within the coming days, blaming rising costs, insufficient revenue and cash crunches as part of the decision. Steward's bankruptcy is set to be one of the largest hospital bankruptcies in U.S. history, and the largest one in decades. The next day, Steward announced that it had indeed filed voluntarily for Chapter 11 bankruptcy protection. The company stressed that its hospitals and medical offices would remain open during the proceedings. In its press release, Steward stated it was finalizing terms of a $75 million in new debtor-in-possession financing from MPT, with the possibility for $225 million more if it meets certain unspecified conditions set by MPT. The company's filing revealed approximately $9 billion in liabilities, including $6.6 billion in long-term rent obligations, $1.2 billion in loans, almost $1 billion in unpaid bills to vendors, and $290 million in unpaid wages and benefits to its employees. In listing its obligations to non-insiders, filings revealed twenty creditors who were owed in excess of $10 million, including a debt of $32 million to the federal government in "reimbursements for insurance overpayments". During proceedings, the company stated it would be putting all 31 of its hospitals up for sale, with auctions scheduled for the summer.

On July 1, the Organized Crime and Corruption Reporting Project published a report, verified by The Boston Globe, revealing that Steward had spent millions since 2018 on surveillance campaigns targeting several parties critical of the company. Leaked correspondence between Steward executives and employees and multiple private intelligence agencies showed that as the company missed payments on operational necessities at its hospitals such as staffing, medical equipment, and repairs, executives directed the prioritization of on-time and early payments to these agencies as "existential work." This work included one agency following and photographing a financial analyst and his family, collecting sensitive information on a former executive (allegedly to retaliate if said person leaked damaging information about Steward), and the alleged forgery of bank statements in order to create the perception that a Maltese politician accepted a bribe to grant a passport to a sanctioned Russian national. While the use of private intelligence agencies is neither uncommon for corporations to engage in, nor necessarily illegal, one expert stated, "even if legal, it’s weird for a hospital system to be spending resources on this." Steward and the involved agencies denied any illegal activity and for the most part declined to respond or comment on specifics, citing confidentiality.

On July 11, CBS News reported that according to anonymous sources, federal prosecutors with the United States Attorney's Office for the District of Massachusetts were investigating Steward for fraud and violations of the Foreign Corrupt Practices Act.

Following bid deadlines, Steward revealed in a court filing that they would be cancelling auctions on three hospitals in Ohio and Pennsylvania after they received no qualified bids. The plan for the facilities—Sharon Regional Medical Center, Hillside Rehabilitation Hospital, and Trumbull Regional Medical Center—was not immediately known. Bloomberg on July 22 reported that Steward had found buyers for at least two hospitals: Wadley Regional Medical Center in Hope, Arkansas and Glenwood Regional Medical Center in West Monroe, Louisiana would be purchased by Pafford Health Systems and American Healthcare Systems respectively, pending a mandated hearing in bankruptcy court.

On July 25, the United States Senate Committee on Health, Education, Labor and Pensions voted 16–4 to subpoena Ralph de la Torre for testimony before the committee on September 12, following multiple declined invitations to voluntarily testify in previous months. According to The Hill, this marked the committee's first ever subpoena to compel testimony.

Further, the governor of Massachusetts shared that Steward had received bids on all of its hospitals in that state. Despite this, Steward said in a statement on July 26 that two of these hospitals, Carney Hospital in Dorchester and Nashoba Valley Medical Center in Ayer would close on August 31, having received no "qualified" bids. The closures were approved by bankruptcy court in an emergency hearing on July 31. In the same hearing, the court also approved a request by Steward to nullify its master lease with MPT, which bound the Massachusetts hospitals to $100 million lease payments until 2040 – allowing new operators the opportunity to negotiate new lease terms. It was not immediately clear how Steward's timeline would meet regulatory requirements, as Massachusetts law requires 120 days' notice to the Department of Public Health prior to closure of essential hospital services – however, Governor Maura Healy later stated that "there is nothing I can do to stop the closure of the two hospitals." It was later revealed that Massachusetts, as part of a tentative agreement with Steward, would advance $30 million in Medicaid payments owed to Steward toward funding hospital operations in the state. $11 million would be paid on August 1, and the remaining $19 million in mid-August. Stipulations in the agreement were expected to require that the provided money be used solely on hospital operations, prohibiting use on rent, debt, or executive compensation, and that the funds were contingent on milestones based on ensuring an orderly transition of hospitals to new operators and orderly closure of those without buyers.

Following the nullification of their Massachusetts lease, MPT and Macquarie Infrastructure Partners turned over the properties to Apollo Global Management, leaving Apollo to handle potential leases or sales of the properties with hospital buyers.

On August 13, Kinderhook Industries announced that its subsidiary, Rural Healthcare Group, would acquire Stewardship Health. While the parties didn't disclose the cost of the transaction, court filings indicated that the tentative price would be $245 million. On the 14th, Steward and Orlando Health entered into an agreement designating the latter as a stalking horse bidder for Steward's Northern Florida hospitals, including Rockledge Regional Medical Center, Melbourne Regional Medical Center, Sebastian River Medical Center, and its local physicians group.

On August 16, the Massachusetts governor's office announced that deals had been finalized to transfer five hospitals to new operators. Merrimack Health (formerly Lawrence General Hospital) is expected to take over Holy Family Hospital's two campuses in Methuen and Haverhill, and Brown University Health (formerly Lifespan Health System) of Rhode Island will enter the state for the first time to take over Morton Hospital and Saint Anne's Hospital. Further, the office stated that the state will take Saint Elizabeth's Medical Center by eminent domain for eventual transfer to Boston Medical Center Health System, which would also purchase Good Samaritan Medical Center. Apollo was expected to challenge the eminent domain seizure, citing a property value assessment of more than $200 million.

The first two permanent closures to result from Steward's bankruptcy occurred on August 31, when Carney Hospital and Nashoba Valley Medical Center, both of Massachusetts, shut down. Carney Hospital, originally a part of predecessor Caritas Christi, was one of Steward's first hospitals, and having been founded in 1863 was the oldest hospital Steward operated.

In September, a deal was announced and tentatively approved by bankruptcy court settling related litigation between Steward and MPT. As part of this deal, Steward agreed to relinquish control of certain of its remaining unsold hospitals to interim operators secured by MPT in exchange for MPT releasing all claims against Steward for overdue and long-term future lease obligations. MPT in a press release identified these operators as Healthcare Systems of America (for facilities in Southeast Florida, East Texas, and Louisiana), HonorHealth (Arizona), Quorum Health (West Texas), and Insight Health (Ohio). These operators, starting September 11, would be "the beneficiaries of operating revenue and have responsibility for the expenses of the hospitals each will manage" until Steward reaches purchase agreements with new permanent operators. Of the deal, MPT said "[f]rom our initial underwriting of these properties, MPT has strongly believed in the mission critical nature of these hospitals as well as their cash flow potential under the right management. [...] By replacing Steward, we are better positioned to protect the critical function of these facilities for the benefit of their communities and the value of our real estate for the benefit of our shareholders."

==== Post-bankruptcy hospital transfers ====
Known disposition of individual hospitals are:

- Arizona
  - Florence Hospital, Mountain Vista Medical Center (Mesa), Tempe St. Luke's Hospital: "Full operational ownership" taken over on an interim basis by HonorHealth as a result of a settlement agreement between Steward and MPT.
  - St. Luke's Behavioral Health Center (Phoenix): No publicly announced bids. Amid bankruptcy proceedings, St, Luke's was evacuated over the weekend of August 9, 2024 due to failure of its HVAC system which led to reported temperatures of 99 °F (37 °C) inside the hospital. Subsequently, the Arizona Department of Health Services suspended the facility's license due to multiple issues, including the HVAC failure, kitchen issues, and staffing shortages.
- Arkansas
  - Wadley Regional Medical Center at Hope: License expected to by purchased by Pafford Health Systems, real estate expected to be purchased by the City of Hope and Hempstead County.
- Florida
  - Coral Gables Hospital, Florida Medical Center (Fort Lauderdale), Hialeah Hospital, North Shore Medical Center (Miami), Palmetto General Hospital (Hialeah): On October 25, 2024, a bankruptcy judge approved the sale of the hospitals to Healthcare Systems of America.
  - Melbourne Regional Medical Center, Rockledge Regional Medical Center, and Sebastian River Medical Center: Orlando Health was designated as a stalking horse bidder for the three hospitals. On September 10, 2024, a bankruptcy judge approved the sale for $439 million to Orlando Health.
- Louisiana
  - Glenwood Regional Medical Center (West Monroe): To be taken over on an interim basis by Healthcare Systems of America as a result of a settlement agreement between Steward and MPT.
- Massachusetts
  - Carney Hospital (Dorchester) and Nashoba Valley Medical Center (Ayer): Permanently closed on August 31, 2024, with no qualified bids.
  - Good Samaritan Medical Center (Brockton): Sold on October 1, 2024, to non-profit BMC Health System.
  - Holy Family Hospital (Haverhill & Methuen): Sold on October 1, 2024, to non-profit Merrimack Health (formerly Lawrence General Hospital.)
  - Morton Hospital (Taunton) and St. Anne's Hospital (Fall River): Sold on October 1, 2024, to non-profit Brown University Health (formerly Lifespan Health Systems) of Rhode Island for $175 million, including hospital licenses, land, and buildings.
  - Norwood Hospital: Closed since 2020 due to flooding, new hospital under construction. Not part of bankruptcy sales.
  - Saint Elizabeth's Medical Center (Brighton): Seized by the state via eminent domain for subsequent transfer to ownership of non-profit Boston Medical Center. Property owner Apollo is expected to challenge the offered price of $4.5 million, citing an assessed combined property and building value of more than $200 million. Operations sold on October 1, 2024, to BMC Health System.
- Ohio
  - Hillside Rehabilitation Hospital (Warren): Slated to begin closure procedures on September 19, 2024, with no qualified bids. However, MPT later indicated this facility was to be taken over on an interim basis by Insight Health as a result of a settlement agreement between Steward and MPT.
  - Trumbull Regional Medical Center (Warren): Slated to begin closure procedures on September 19, 2024, with no qualified bids. However, Warren city leadership announced a preliminary plan to assist non-profit Warren City Hospital in acquiring the hospital. This plan, according to officials, will require approximately $30 million, which would need to be funded largely through donations. According to Trumbull County Commissioner Denny Malloy, most of the needed cash has been committed, but more is needed. On August 28, reports emerged that the hospital's emergency department, while remaining open, had begun diverting ambulances to other hospitals. To be taken over on an interim basis by Insight Health as a result of a settlement agreement between Steward and MPT.
- Pennsylvania
  - Sharon Regional Medical Center: According to Pennsylvania Attorney General Michelle Henry through a bankruptcy court filing, preliminary details of a funding plan for the purchase of the hospital by Meadville Medical Center had been worked out, and a letter of intent sent to Steward on August 17, 2024. After this, according to Henry, Steward sent "daily threats" of issuing a closure notice to the state if the state did not give Steward $1.5 million by August 23. In her filing, Henry stated that a closure in the timeframe Steward was suggesting would be in violation of state law. She further stated that the Commonwealth was considering the requested funding, but that it could not realistically be completed in that timeframe, and so requested that the court order Steward to cease their threats of closure to give the state enough time to arrange funding. The judge granted the AG's request on August 22, ordering Steward not to announce a closure of the hospital before August 31 and suggesting that Pennsylvania or Meadville Medical help provide interim funding, as it was "clear that the debtors just don't have the money to keep this going."
- Texas
  - Medical Center of Southeast Texas (Port Arthur), St. Joseph Medical Center (Houston):On October 25, 2024, a bankruptcy judge approved the sale of the hospitals to Healthcare Systems of America.
  - Odessa Regional Medical Center, Scenic Mountain Medical Center (Big Spring): To be taken over on an interim basis by Quorum Health as a result of a settlement agreement between Steward and MPT.
  - Wadley Regional Medical Center (Texarkana): CHRISTUS Health named as stalking horse bidder on September 9, 2024.

=== 2025–present: Steward Health Care v. de la Torre, et al. ===
In July 2025, Steward, under new management for its bankruptcy, filed an adversary case against de la Torre, other executives, some of their holding companies, and Tenet Healthcare alleging financial mismanagement in the service of personal gain while Steward was insolvent. Their suit alleged that since the time of Cerberus' exit from Steward, de la Torre and others, knowing that the company was insolvent, were involved in a concerted effort to extract large dividends and otherwise used the company to enrich themselves.

Their complaint was centered around three transactions:

1. The $111 million dividend issued in 2021: Steward alleges that de la Torre orchestrated an effort to change policies and arrange holding companies in such a way as to give himself maximum authority to approve dividends.
2. The $1.1 billion purchase of Tenet's Miami hospitals: Steward alleges that the company was poised to only pay $895 million, however that de la Torre and others later paid $1.1 billion without any effort to have the actual values of the hospitals assessed. Further, the purchase was intended to be paid for in part by the sale of several of Steward's hospitals in Utah, however the company did not wait for a final agreement on the Utah sale before closing the Florida purchase. Steward accused de la Torre of pushing the purchase through out of a "personal desire to build a hospital empire in the Miami area." Ultimately, after the Florida purchase closed, the Utah sale was blocked by the Federal Trade Commission, and the assets were not sold for another two years.
3. The 2022 sale of its managed care arm to CareMax: Steward alleges that this sale was structured in such a way as to direct a large portion of the proceeds to de la Torre and others. According to Steward, the company received about $60 million from the sale, while the rest, $134 million in CareMax stock, went to a company owned by de la Torre and other insiders, which then distributed the stocks to its owners.

Steward alleged that these acts by its former executives amounted to fraud and gross dereliction of duty to the company. As of September 2025, the case remained pending.

== Steward Health Care International ==
Steward Health Care International
- Type: Private
- Industry: Healthcare
- Founder: Ralph de la Torre
- Headquarters: Madrid, Spain
- Number of locations: 4 hospitals
- Areas served: Colombia; Saudi Arabia; United Arab Emirates

Steward Health Care International is Steward's arm for its operations outside of the United States. Its headquarters are located in the Salamanca district of Madrid, Spain.

=== Malta ===
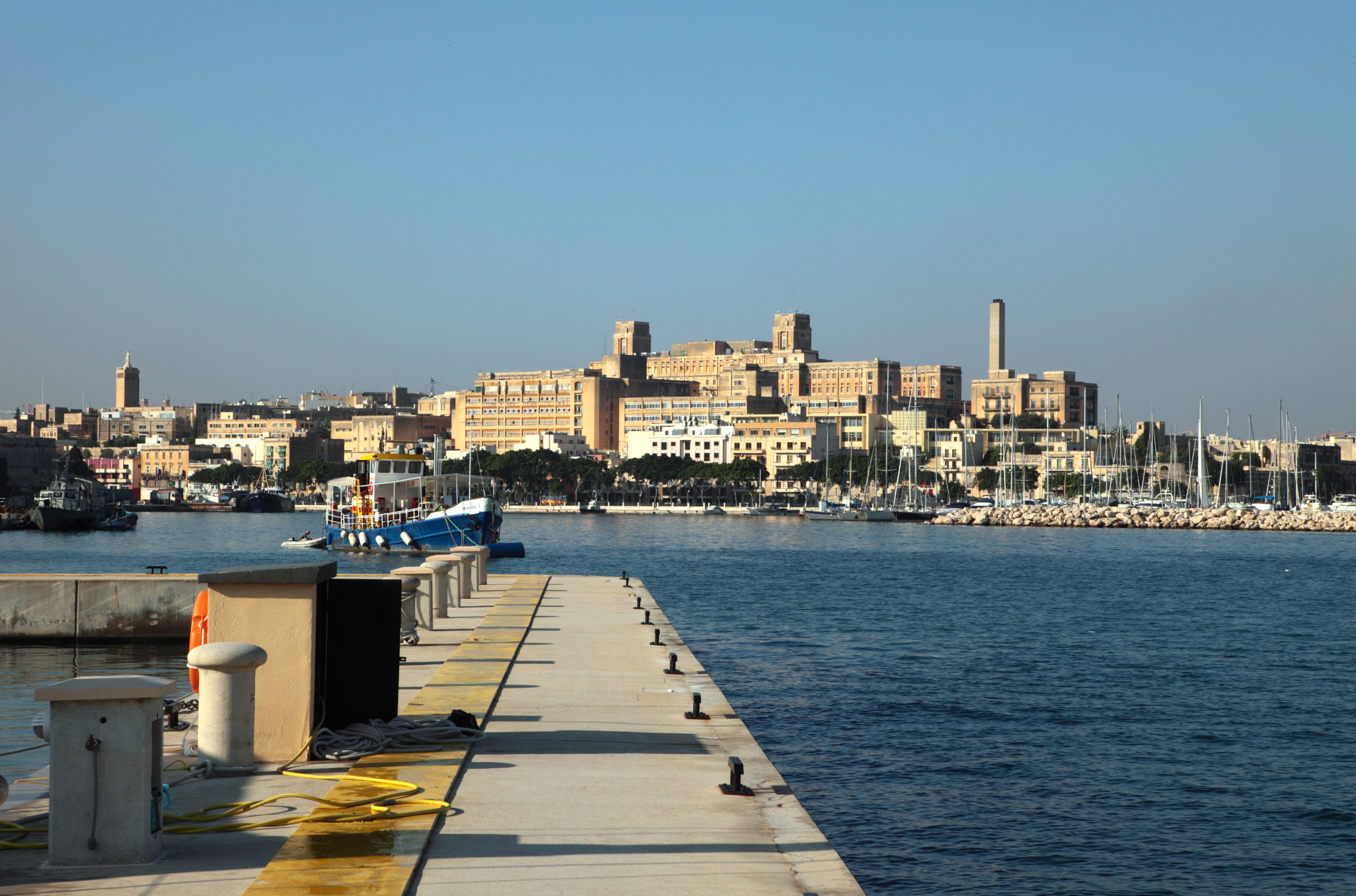
St. Luke's Hospital in Malta

At the end of 2017, Steward announced an upcoming international expansion which was finalized in February 2018, in which they took over Vitals Global Healthcare of Malta, creating Steward Health Care International. Vitals, an embattled Maltese healthcare company, was the center of a controversial 2015 public-private partnership in which it entered a concession agreement with the government to operate three of the island nation's hospitals for thirty years. The agreement with Vitals was widely controversial especially among physicians, who raised concerns both about the government relinquishing control of the public healthcare system and about VGH's lack of experience in the healthcare sector.

In 2018, amid allegations of collusion between VGH and government officials, lack of progress in the rehabilitation of the hospitals, and accusations that VGH was siphoning money out of the country, parties agreed to a deal that would see Steward purchase VGH for just €1, while the Maltese government would pay VGH €50 million to accept the deal. The transfer of the concession to Steward did not sate the public's concerns and triggered the organization of a medical workers' strike by the Medical Association of Malta. Steward's presence remained unpopular until 2023 when Maltese courts annulled the 2018 deal amid continued allegations of fraud and lack of progress in hospital renovations and construction, ultimately returning control of the hospitals to the government.

In May 2024, concurrent with the company's U.S. financial struggles, Maltese investigators announced that they would be recommending charges against thirty-four individuals associated with VGH, Steward, and Swiss firm Accutor, including Steward CEO de la Torre. The charges included criminal conspiracy, trading-in-influence, misappropriation of public funds, fraud, money laundering, and bribery of local officials. The office of the Attorney General of Malta confirmed that the thirty-four individuals would face charges as recommended by investigators. The charges stem from allegations that Steward and VGH conspired with Maltese Prime Minister Joseph Muscat, his chief of staff Keith Schembri, and Minister of Tourism Konrad Mizzi, who were already charged, in order to secure the government contract and attain political influence in later renegotiations of the contract with the Maltese government. VGH and Steward were alleged to have bribed the officials via a slush fund of €1 million laundered through Accutor, a Swiss consulting firm. Steward, Muscat, Schembri, and Mizzi denied the accusations. Steward publicly claims that it hired Accutor "as a business management consultant," and Steward President Armin Ernst in a 2019 internal e-mail described the agreement as intended to support “political and government activities and interactions.” Investigators said that after leaving office, Muscat and Mizzi became paid consultants of Accutor, with Schembri also appearing to benefit indirectly. Two Accutor directors later resigned from the company, reporting that they became aware of an arrangement apparently concealed by company executives in which the three government officials were to receive €18 million as partners in the hospital deal. Current Accutor officials denied the accusations. The Times of Malta reported in May 2024 that investigators "concluded that the chances Muscat, Schembri and Mizzi happened to all then go on to independently form relationships with Accutor is considered so negligible that the possibility is excluded," and that they further "observed that had the arrangement in any way been a donation towards genuine political purposes connected to Malta it would not have been necessary to send the payments offshore to Switzerland."

On June 17, 2024, The Boston Globe published an investigative report into Steward Malta. Their investigation included an interview with Joseph Muscat, the day before he was formally charged, who placed blame on Steward for failing to deliver on the requirements of the concession. Muscat claimed that, at the time the deal was transferred to Steward, they seemed like an "obvious choice" given Boston's reputation for healthcare.

There is the impression from the outside that in the United States there is scrutiny in most sectors, so having one of the largest private hospital operators in the United States with one of the main private equity funds as their backers, I couldn’t see the problem.

— Joseph Muscat, in a May 2024 interview with The Boston Globe

A spokesperson for Steward distanced Steward's U.S. operation from Steward International, though the Maltese investigation found that for some time, Steward's international offices were co-located with its American ones and that some payments went through Steward's domestic accounts. Separately, a public relations firm representing Steward International maintained that they entered and executed the concession in good faith and that they were not consulted in the magistrate's inquiry. As of The Globe's report, no U.S.-based Steward officials have been charged.

=== Colombia ===
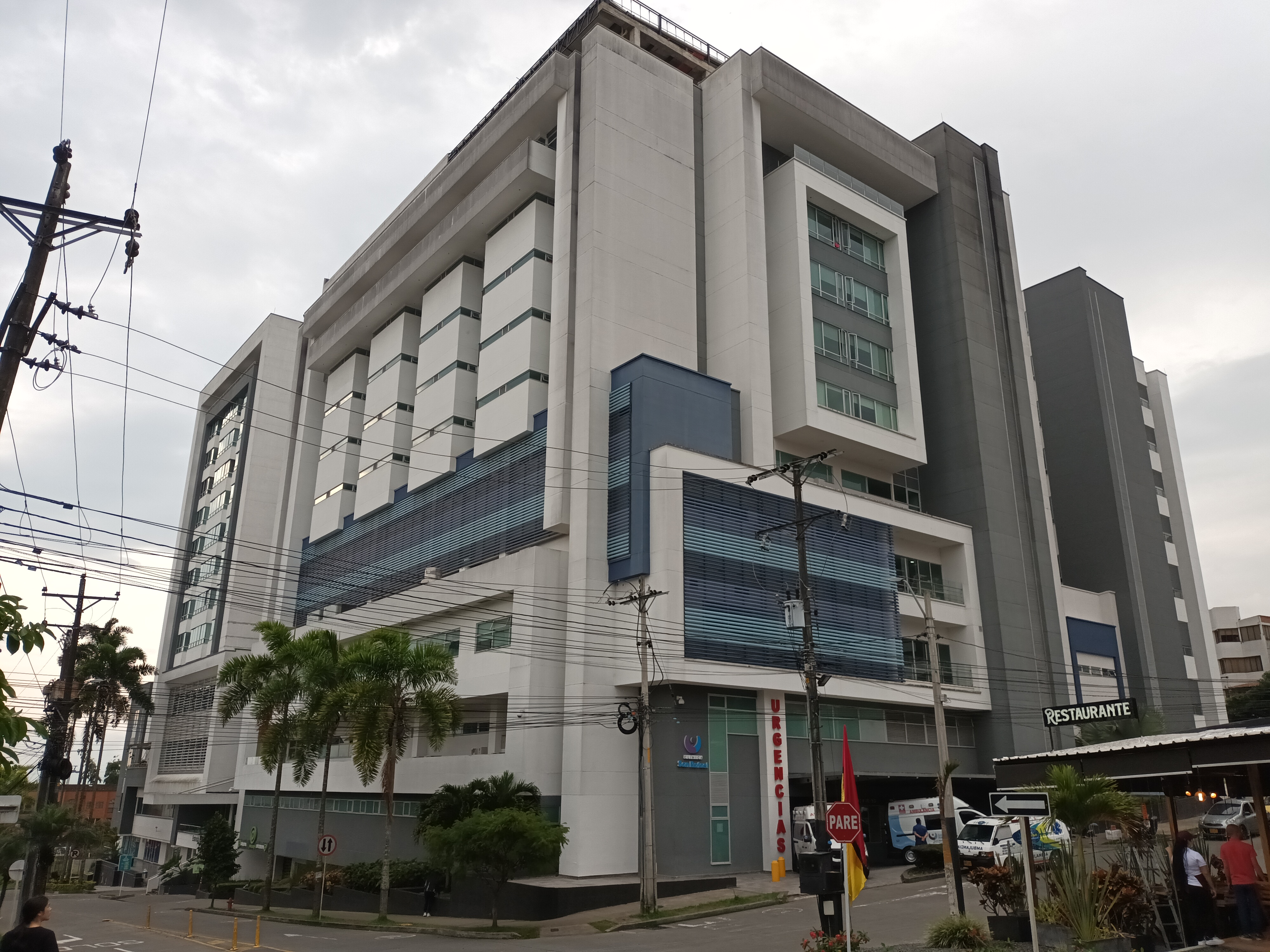
Clínica San Rafael, a hospital built and operated by Steward in Pereira, Colombia

In late 2020, Steward entered the Colombian healthcare market with the purchase of three hospitals in the country: Hospital Universitario Clínica San Rafael and Clínica Centenario in the capital city of Bogotá, and Clínica Los Nevados in Pereira. CEO Ralph de la Torre spoke about Steward's plans and goals in the nation, saying that COL$102.000 million (US$28 million) would be invested in the three hospitals, most of which would be spent on Los Nevados which had been closed following damage from an earthquake several years prior. De la Torre expressed that Steward wanted to grow significantly in the region, hoping to eventually have "between 10 and 15 hospitals in the country." In 2023, Steward opened two hospitals in Colombia: the new Clínica San Rafael in Popayán and the fully renovated Clínica Los Nevados.

While Steward International assured the Colombian public in May 2024 and later that year that their recently announced bankruptcy in the U.S. would not affect its hospitals in Colombia, saying the two divisions were not codependent, and that "there is no impact that could materialize in Colombia as a result of what happened in the United States," local media reported that the hospitals there were facing many of the same issues the company was facing in the United States, including unpaid vendors, unpaid employees (in some instances behind by up to six months), and lack of emergency equipment. The president of Steward Colombia responded to those reports, confirming that they were experiencing these challenges, but reiterating that they were independent of the U.S. operation and attributing these issues not to the U.S. bankruptcy, but mainly to low reimbursement rates by the country's public health system.

=== Middle East ===
In 2022, Steward International created Steward Middle East, which partnered with Saudi Arabian venture capital company Alfanar to create a joint venture named Steward alf Global Healthcare Company. That year, they signed a contract with the Red Sea Development Company to build and operate a new hospital as part of the Red Sea Project, a massive tourism development under construction on the nation's coast. The company would also be responsible for emergency response planning for the site. Steward Middle East also reportedly included ventures in Riyadh as well as Dubai in the UAE. In 2023, a Steward representative expressed the company's interest in expanding into Egypt.

== Operations ==
=== Governance ===
==== Senior Leadership Team ====
Position	Holder	Notes
Chief Executive Officer	Ralph de la Torre	Also served as chair of board of directors. Resigned October 1, 2024
Chief Information Officer	David Colarusso	
Chief Strategy Officer	Rubén King-Shaw Jr.	Also served on board of directors
Executive Vice President for Physician Services	Michael G. Callum	Also served on board of directors
Chief Physician Executive, Steward Health Care Network	Joseph Weinstein	
Executive Vice President, Human Resources	Patrick Lombardo	

==== Board of Directors ====
Director	Notes
Ralph de la Torre (Chair)	Also served as CEO until his resignation on October 1, 2024
John Boener	Former U.S. House Speaker
Sister Vimala Vadakumpadan	Member of the Dominican Sisters of the Presentation. Also serves as chair of Steward's Saint Anne's Hospital
Carlos H. Hernandez	
James J. Karam	
Michael G. Callum	Also served as Executive Vice President for Physician Services
Rubén King-Shaw Jr.	Also served as Chief Strategy Officer

=== Business model ===
Steward operates a for-profit health system generally consistent with the widely used model of integrated care, in which health systems acquire or otherwise affiliate with a diverse range of health services in order to keep patients in-system and avoid referrals to other providers where possible. Steward's services encompass emergency care, inpatient and outpatient care of various specialties, primary care, a physician network, and health insurance.

For much of its existence, Steward has funded domestic and international expansion through both debt and sale-leaseback transactions. A significant amount of both types of transactions have involved Steward's largest landlord, Medical Properties Trust (MPT), a healthcare real estate investment trust (REIT). The company has largely financed its expansions retroactively by purchasing other health systems or individual hospitals and subsequently selling their newly acquired facilities' real estate to MPT, thereby recouping significant percentages of the cost of the acquisitions. For example, Steward's first interstate expansion saw it purchase eight hospitals from Community Health Systems in 2017 for $311 million. Shortly thereafter, the real estate of the hospitals was sold to MPT for $301.3 million – bringing the immediate cost of the hospitals down to $10.6 million (not including resulting lease obligations). The vast majority of the system's real estate today belongs to MPT, with some exceptions such as in Massachusetts, where in 2022 MPT split the properties 50/50 with Macquarie Asset Management of Australia.

To some degree, Steward directly manages significant financial transactions of its hospitals at the corporate level, though the extent to which they exert this influence is not entirely clear. One hospital's president reported, as part of a state investigation, that as hospitals fell into debt, Steward's corporate offices were in control of which vendors would be paid with what funds the hospital had.

=== Services ===
Steward Health Care directly manages a network of hospitals across several states. In addition, it comprised several subsidiaries which manage different aspects of its integrated healthcare model:

- Steward Medical Group and Steward Health Care Network comprised the company's network of primary care and specialty providers. Steward sold the divisions to Kinderhook Industries in 2024, and they were renamed Revere Medical.
- Steward Health Choice was a commercial Medicaid option offered in Massachusetts and Arizona. Steward Health Choice of Arizona was sold to Blue Cross Blue Shield of Arizona in 2020. Steward Health Choice of Massachusetts was sold to Revere Medical in 2024.
- Steward Health Care International administers several ventures overseas.

=== Criticism ===
Steward has received criticism for its approach to health care and transparency, especially following the revelation of significant financial struggles in the beginning of 2024. Health care officials have pointed to the concerns which Steward's financial condition and operations has raised about the role of private equity in healthcare.

In 2017, Steward sued the Massachusetts Center for Health Information and Analysis (CHIA) to avoid providing financial information to the agency. CHIA, an independent state agency charged with monitoring the financial condition of Massachusetts' hospital industry, had been in talks with Steward since the previous year in an attempt to reach a deal over its financial disclosures, and had been imposing fines of $1000 per week for delinquency. At the time, Steward was the only hospital system in the state to repeatedly fail to submit required company-wide financial statements, not having fulfilled the requirement since 2015. In its suit, Steward said that the financial statements "contain sensitive, proprietary business information related to long-term debt, relationships with investors, retirement plans, and significant transactions that is not otherwise publicly available [...] Steward keeps information contained in the notes [of its financial statements] confidential because releasing the notes would cause harm to Steward." Steward further stated that their concerns were related to CHIA's past publicization of their financial data, and argued that the agency had no authority to collect the information. In 2023, a judge ruled in favor of the state, confirming that CHIA had the authority to demand the information. Steward filed an appeal, which was still pending into early 2024 and which state officials have highlighted—U.S. House Representative Stephen Lynch said in January, "we had not had advance notice prior to a week ago that they were in difficulty, or that they were contemplating exiting the Massachusetts health care market."

Many have pointed to Steward's sales of its acquired hospitals' properties to Medical Properties Trust over the years as a key factor in their current financial state, given at least $50 million of their debt is in past-due rent payments on these properties. In 2023, just before the closing of Steward's Texas Vista Medical Center, Steward officials stated that the lease payment on the hospital was $5 million per year, saying "[t]hat represents 3% of the annual operating budget and was absolutely not a factor in the decision to close the hospital." However, audio obtained by CBS News of a Steward leadership meeting revealed that the system was "trying to get out of lease obligations."

Further, Steward's debts to outside vendors have raised concerns for patient safety, especially after multiple adverse incidents across its hospitals relating to staffing and equipment availability. Following several patient deaths and safety incidents alleged to have been avoidable at two Massachusetts hospitals, state officials in 2024 planned to place monitors at all Steward hospitals in the state to ensure quality care and safety.

Steward has attributed much of its financial woes in Massachusetts to the COVID-19 pandemic, as well as their system mainly comprising community hospitals which serve low-income populations, where 70% of their patients are recipients of Medicare and Medicaid. They also complained of what they described as a gap between the reimbursement rates which public and private insurers pay community hospitals versus larger academic medical centers. State officials, in response, raised questions regarding the use of tens of millions of dollars in pandemic relief provided to the company by the federal government. Bloomberg reported in September 2020 that at the time, the amount Steward had received in federal grants and loans stood at $675 million.

Elsewhere, such as in Texas and Arizona, Steward has pointed to under-utilization as a factor in closures. In Phoenix for example, St. Luke's Medical Center's former CEO said the hospital's 2019 closure came as two out of three beds were routinely unoccupied.

Massachusetts Governor Maura Healey, in a February 2024 letter to Ralph de la Torre, criticized the system's handling of the crisis, what brought them there, and their seeming opacity with state officials throughout.

Massachusetts law requires disclosure of hospitals’ system-level audited financial statements to help us avoid precisely the situation you have created: we have no insight into your allocation of resources across operating units or states, and therefore no clear sense of the financial viability of the hospitals serving Massachusetts residents.

— Massachusetts Governor Maura Healey

Defending themselves, Steward responded in two press releases stating that they have "tried to be transparent, compliant and cooperative over the years in providing a significant amount of detailed and relevant financial documentation to various state agencies and regulatory bodies and moving forward it commits to do even better." They also stated that "[w]e have played with our cards face up on these data requests," and that "at their request, we have provided the Attorney General (AGO) and Executive Office of Health and Human Services (EOHHS) 613 megabytes—running across tens of thousands of pages—of financial and operating materials over the last two months," despite their earlier appeal to avoid providing complete information.

== Hospitals ==
=== Domestic (United States) ===
List of current and former Steward hospitals in the U.S.
Hospital	Settlement	State	Emergency department	Founded	Status	Notes
Carney Hospital	Dorchester	MA	Yes	1863	Closed August 2024	One of Steward's original facilities. Founded by Daughters of Charity of Saint Vincent de Paul and Andrew Carney. First Catholic hospital in New England.
Coral Gables Hospital	Coral Gables	FL	Yes	1926	Sold 2024	Founded as Tallman Hospital, renamed to Coral Gables Hospital after being purchased by Hospital Affiliates, Inc. in 1971. Purchased by Steward from Tenet Healthcare in August 2021
Davis Hospital and Medical Center	Layton	UT	Yes	1976	Sold 2023	Acquired by Steward in September 2017 as part of purchase of IASIS Healthcare. Sold in 2023 to CommonSpirit Health and renamed Holy Cross Hospital – Davis.
Florence Hospital	Florence	AZ	Yes		Sold October 2024	Taken over on an interim basis by HonorHealth on October 3, 2024, as a result of bankruptcy.
Florida Medical Center	Fort Lauderdale	FL	Yes	1973	Sold 2024	Purchased by Steward from Tenet Healthcare in August 2021.
Glenwood Regional Medical Center	West Monroe	LA	Yes	1962	Sold 2024	Acquired by Steward in September 2017 as part of purchase of IASIS Healthcare.
Good Samaritan Medical Center	Brockton	MA	Yes	1968	Sold October 2024	One of Steward's original facilities. Originally named Cardinal Cushing Hospital, was renamed after 1994 merger with Goddard Memorial Hospital. Sold in 2024 to BMC Health System as part of bankruptcy.
Hialeah Hospital	Hialeah	FL	Yes	1951	Sold 2024	Purchased by Steward from Tenet Healthcare in August 2021.
Hillside Rehabilitation Hospital	Warren	OH	No	1963	Sold 2024	Purchased by Steward from Community Health Systems in May 2017.
Holy Family Hospital (Haverhill)	Haverhill	MA	Yes	1887	Sold October 2024	One of Steward's original hospitals. Originally owned by the city of Haverhill and named Hale Hospital. Renamed Merrimack Valley Hospital when city sold hospital to Essent Health Care. Integrated under the Holy Family Hospital name by Steward in 2014. Sold in 2024 to Merrimack Health (formerly Lawrence General Hospital) as part of bankruptcy.
Holy Family Hospital (Methuen)	Methuen	MA	Yes	1950	Sold October 2024	One of Steward's original hospitals. Originally named Bon Secours Hospital. Sold in 2024 to Merrimack Health (formerly Lawrence General Hospital) as part of bankruptcy.
Jordan Valley Medical Center	West Jordan	UT	Yes	1983	Sold 2023	Acquired by Steward in September 2017 as part of purchase of IASIS Healthcare. Sold in 2023 to CommonSpirit Health and renamed Holy Cross Hospital – Jordan Valley.
Jordan Valley Medical Center – West Valley Campus	West Valley City	UT	Yes	1964	Sold 2023	Acquired by Steward in September 2017 as part of purchase of IASIS Healthcare. Sold in 2023 to CommonSpirit Health and renamed Holy Cross Hospital – Jordan Valley West.
Melbourne Regional Medical Center	Melbourne	FL	Yes	2002	Sold 2024	Originally named Wuesthoff Medical Center. Purchased by Steward from Community Health Systems in May 2017 and renamed.
Morton Hospital	Taunton	MA	Yes	1889	Sold October 2024	One of Steward's original facilities. Sold in 2024 to Lifespan of Rhode Island as part of bankruptcy.
Mountain Point Medical Center	Lehi	UT	Yes	2015	Sold 2023	Acquired by Steward in September 2017 as part of purchase of IASIS Healthcare. Sold in 2023 to CommonSpirit Health and renamed Holy Cross Hospital – Mountain Point.
Mountain Vista Medical Center	Mesa	AZ	Yes	2007	Sold October 2024	Acquired by Steward in September 2017 as part of purchase of IASIS Healthcare. Taken over on an interim basis by HonorHealth on October 3, 2024, as a result of bankruptcy.
Nashoba Valley Medical Center	Ayer	MA	Yes	1965	Closed August 2024	Originally named Nashoba Community Hospital. One of Steward's original facilities.
New England Sinai Hospital	Stoughton	MA	No	1927	Closed April 2024	Founded as the Jewish Tuberculosis Sanatorium in 1927, originally in Rutland, MA. Renamed New England Sinai when it moved to Jamaica Plain in 1954. Moved to Stoughton in 1976. Purchased by Steward in 2012
North Shore Medical Center	Miami	FL	No	1953	Sold 2024	Purchased by Steward from Tenet Healthcare in August 2021.
Norwood Hospital	Norwood	MA	Yes	1917–1919	Closed 2020	One of Steward's original facilities. Evacuated and demolished following flood in 2020. Construction of replacement facility stopped October 2024.
Odessa Regional Medical Center	Odessa	TX	Yes	1975	Operations Assumed by Quorum Health	Acquired by Steward in September 2017 as part of purchase of IASIS Healthcare.
Palmetto General Hospital	Hialeah	FL	Yes	1971	Sold 2024	Purchased by Steward from Tenet Healthcare in August 2021.
Pikes Peak Regional Hospital	Woodland Park	CO	Yes	2006	Sold 2018	Acquired by Steward in September 2017 as part of purchase of IASIS Healthcare. Sold in 2018 to UCHealth.
Quincy Medical Center	Quincy	MA	Yes	1890	Closed 2014, Emergency Room kept open through 2015	Purchased by Steward through bankruptcy court in 2011
Rockledge Regional Medical Center	Rockledge	FL	Yes	1941	Sold 2024	Originally named Eugene Wuesthoff Memorial Hospital. Acquired and renamed by Steward in September 2017 as part of purchase of IASIS Healthcare. Sold to Orlando Health, which closed the facility in 2025 with plans to demolish the building and sell the property.
Salt Lake Regional Medical Center	Salt Lake City	UT	Yes	1875	Sold 2023	Acquired by Steward in September 2017 as part of purchase of IASIS Healthcare. Sold in 2023 to CommonSpirit Health and renamed Holy Cross Hospital – Salt Lake.
Scenic Mountain Medical Center	Big Spring	TX	Yes	c. 1975	Sold 2024	
Sebastian River Medical Center	Sebastian	FL	Yes	1974	Sold 2024	Purchased by Steward from Community Health Systems in May 2017.
Sharon Regional Medical Center	Sharon	PA	Yes	1896	Closed January 2025 due to safety concerns	Originally named Christian H. Buhl Hospital. Purchased by Steward from Community Health Systems in May 2017.
St. Anne's Hospital	Fall River	MA	Yes	1906	Sold October 2024	One of Steward's original facilities. Sold in 2024 to Brown University Health (formerly Lifespan) as part of bankruptcy.
St. Elizabeth's Medical Center	Brighton	MA	Yes	1868	Sold October 2024	One of Steward's original facilities. Sold to BMC Health System in 2024 as part of bankruptcy
St. Joseph Medical Center	Houston	TX	Yes	1887	Sold 2024	Acquired by Steward in September 2017 as part of purchase of IASIS Healthcare.
St. Luke's Behavioral Health Center	Phoenix	AZ	No	1969	Closed August 2024 due to broken A/C. Reopened with limited capacity December 2024	Acquired by Steward in September 2017 as part of purchase of IASIS Healthcare.
St. Luke's Medical Center	Phoenix	AZ	Yes	1907	Closed 2019	Acquired by Steward in September 2017 as part of purchase of IASIS Healthcare. Ended normal operations in 2019, but was readied for potential use as a surge facility during the COVID-19 pandemic.
Tempe St. Luke's Hospital	Tempe	AZ	Yes	1944	Sold October 2024	Acquired by Steward in September 2017 as part of purchase of IASIS Healthcare. Taken over on an interim basis by HonorHealth on October 3, 2024, as a result of bankruptcy.
Texas Vista Medical Center	San Antonio	TX		1979	Closed 2023	Formerly named Southwest General Hospital. Acquired by Steward in September 2017 as part of purchase of IASIS Healthcare.
The Medical Center of Southeast Texas	Port Arthur	TX	Yes	2005	Operations assumed by Healthcare Systems of America	Acquired by Steward in September 2017 as part of purchase of IASIS Healthcare.
The Medical Center of Southeast Texas – Victory Campus	Beaumont	TX	Yes	2013	Closed February 2024	Originally named Victory Medical Center Beaumont until purchase by The Medical Center of Southeast Texas in 2015. Acquired by Steward in September 2017 as part of purchase of IASIS Healthcare.
Trumbull Regional Medical Center	Warren	OH	Yes	1907	Sold 2024	Acquired by Steward in September 2017 as part of purchase of IASIS Healthcare.
Wadley Regional Medical Center	Texarkana	TX	Yes	1900	Operations assumed by CHRISTUS Health	Acquired by Steward in September 2017 as part of purchase of IASIS Healthcare. Construction began in 2021 of future replacement facility at a different location in Texarkana.
Wadley Regional Medical Center at Hope	Hope	AR	Yes	1955	Sold 2024	Originally named Hempstead County Memorial Hospital. Acquired by Steward in September 2017 as part of purchase of IASIS Healthcare.

=== International ===
List of current and former Steward hospitals outside the U.S.
Hospital	Municipality	Country	Emergency Department	Founded	Status	Notes
Clínica Centenario	Bogotá	Colombia			Open	
Clínica Los Nevados	Pereira	Colombia	Yes	Reopened 2023	Open	
Clínica San Rafael de Popayán	Popayán	Colombia	Yes	2023	Open	
Hospital Universitario Clínica San Rafael	Bogotá	Colombia	Yes		Open	
Gozo General Hospital	Victoria	Malta			Open	
Karin Grecht Hospital	Pietà	Malta			Open	
St. Luke's Hospital	Pietà	Malta			Closed for refurbishment	
Coastal Village Hospital	The Red Sea	Saudi Arabia	Planned	Future	Being developed	Planned for construction in a residential section of the Red Sea Project, a tourism project on the west coast of Saudi Arabia. Emergency department will be specialized for tourism, including having a hyperbaric chamber.

== See also ==
- Medical Properties Trust
- Beth Israel Lahey Health
- Mass General Brigham
- HCA Healthcare
- Tenet Healthcare
- Community Health Systems
