= Norwood Hospital =

Closed hospital in Massachusetts

Coordinates: 42°11′20.25″N 71°12′06.18″W

- Steward Health Care System

Geography
- Location: Norwood, Massachusetts, United States

Organization
- Care system: Private
- Type: Community

Services
- Emergency department: Yes
- Beds: 231

Helipads
- Helipad: Yes
Number	Length		Surface
Number	ft	m	Surface
H1			Concrete: Bus 34E; Franklin/Foxboro

History
- Opened: 1919
- Closed: June 2020

Links
- Lists: Hospitals in Massachusetts

Norwood Hospital was a small for-profit community hospital in Norwood, Massachusetts. A member of Steward Health Care, the hospital was evacuated and closed after a significant June 2020 rainstorm led to destructive flooding. While reconstruction was started to reopen the hospital, work halted in February 2024 amid reports of financial instability and unpaid bills across the Steward Health Care System.

== History ==
=== 20th century ===
Norwood Hospital's roots lie in a medical practice created around the turn of the 20th century. In the 1900s, the small town and surrounding communities were first served by a small practice housed in the home of local physician Eben C. Norton. Sometime in that same decade, local German immigrant Anna Groote began taking patients into her family's home in the town's Germantown neighborhood. Anna was eventually joined by Dr. Thomas O'Toole, who oversaw what came to be known as the Wilson Street Hospital as it grew into the 1910s. Groote's hospital eventually expanded to include patient rooms, a nursery, and an operating room.

In 1913, Dr. Norton's practice was purchased by prominent Norwood citizen George Willett, known for contributing financially and intellectually to Norwood's development. Willett combined Norton's practice with the "Old Corner House," a two-family residence which Willett had purchased earlier as part of a civic project. Together, the new health center consisted of 23 patient beds, an operating theater, and dental and eye clinics.

The 1918 Spanish flu pandemic hit the local immigrant population hard, and Groote's Wilson Street Hospital was forced to close. Around this time, demand for care at Willett's hospital surged, necessitating the use of the town's civic association building to hold overflow patients. Seeing the need for an expansion of the facility, a group of citizens formed to create the Norwood Hospital Corporation, which took over Willett's facility in 1919 and began plans for growth.

The newly formed Norwood Hospital remained housed across the Corner House and Dr. Norton's former residence until 1926. The previous year, a fundraiser was held with a $200,000 goal to fund the construction of a new hospital complex, which exceeded its goal by more than $50,000. The new hospital was built behind the old facility, could hold 75 patients, and housed an emergency room, an isolation room, a pharmacy, an operating room, and a maternity ward, as well as several general inpatient beds split into men's and women's wards. Betty Eicke, a nurse trained at Salem Hospital and who had served as superintendent at Lawrence General Hospital, was appointed as the first superintendent of the new hospital. The new building officially opened on September 1, 1926.

In 1982, Norwood Hospital formed the Neponset Valley Health System, a regional health care system which would come to include a multitude of facilities of varying specialties, including the Southwood Community Hospital in Norfolk, the Foxboro Area Health Center, the NORCAP Center for Alcoholism, and Norfolk-Bristol Home Health Services, among others. The health system was purchased by Caritas Christi Health Care in 1997, which in turn was purchased by Steward Health Care System in 2010, marking the hospital's transition from non-profit to for-profit.

=== 21st century ===
In 2016, the hospital's property was sold by Steward to Medical Properties Trust, along with the vast majority of the hospital system's real estate nationwide. The sale was part of a sale-leaseback deal which would see a large influx in cash for the hospital system to pay for national expansion and investor dividends, in exchange entering the hospitals into triple-net leases.

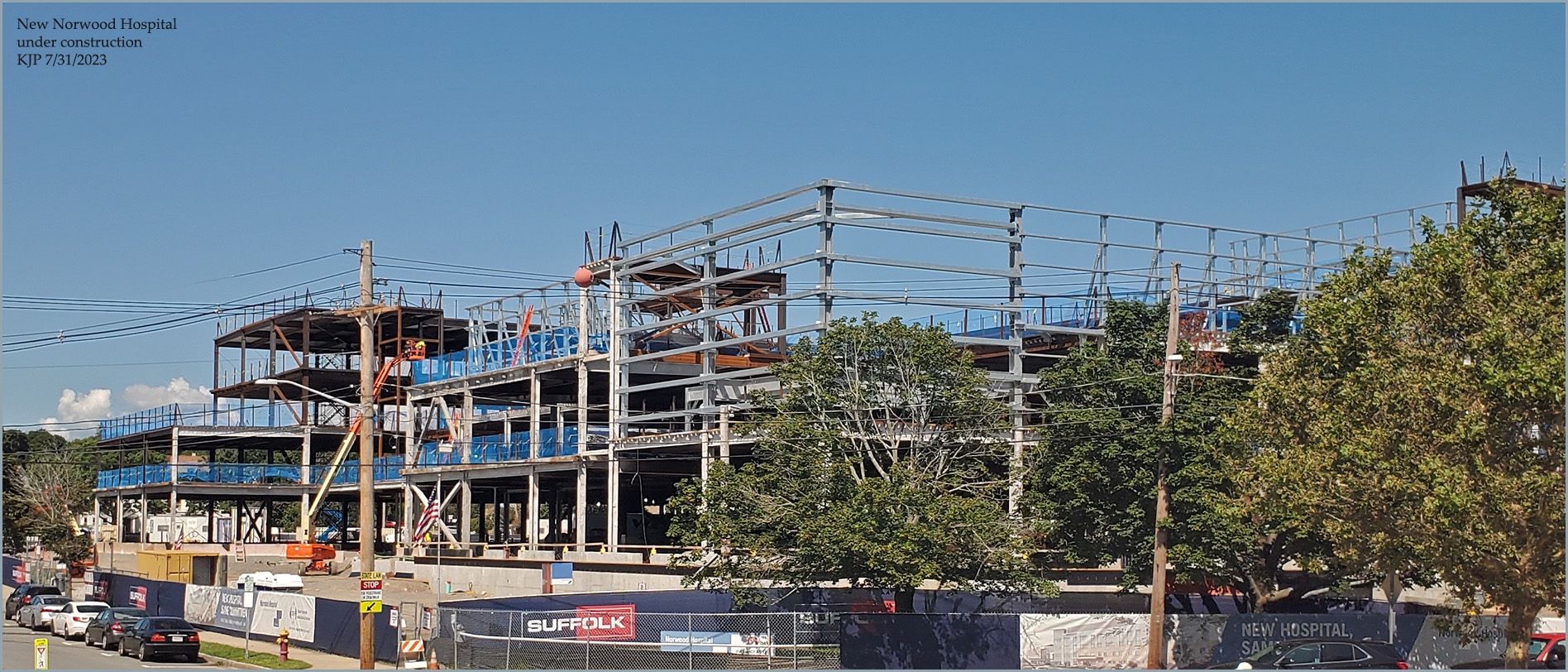
Norwood Hospital, steel frame. July 2023

On June 28, 2020, a significant rain storm struck the region, dropping four inches of rain within 90 minutes. Norwood hospital itself saw extensive damage, suffering a power outage and the destruction of its backup generators. The hospital was forced to fully evacuate, with over 100 patients being transported to other hospitals. Footage from security cameras later circulated showing flood waters breaching a door and surging through a first floor hallway. Due to the extent of the damage, Steward Health Care announced that the hospital would have to be rebuilt. The hospital was demolished in 2022, and construction on the new hospital began, expected to cost about $375 million.

However, the start of 2024 was marked by financial turmoil for Norwood Hospital's parent organization Steward Health Care, which faced mounting reports of unpaid bills to vendors across the country, in addition to $50 million in unpaid rent on its hospitals to Medical Properties Trust. Inability to pay contractors led to a halt of construction on Norwood Hospital, and Steward later stated that the hospital was one of several Massachusetts hospitals the system was looking to sell in their exit from the Massachusetts healthcare market.

On May 5, 2024, The Wall Street Journal reported that Steward Health Care was expected to file for Chapter 11 bankruptcy protection within the coming days, blaming rising costs, insufficient revenue and cash crunches as part of the decision. Steward's bankruptcy is set to be one of the largest hospital bankruptcies in U.S. history, and the largest one in decades. The next day, Steward announced that it had indeed filed voluntarily for Chapter 11 bankruptcy protection. The company stressed that its hospitals and medical offices would remain open during the proceedings. In its press release, Steward stated it was finalizing terms of a $75 million in new debtor-in-possession financing from MPT, with the possibility for $225 million more if it meets certain unspecified conditions set by MPT. The company's filing papers list that more than 30 of its creditors owe about $500 million, and the U.S. government is owed $32 million to the federal government in "reimbursements for insurance overpayments".

On February 1, 2025, the Town of Norwood announced that it was forming a "health care working group" in order to reopen the hospital. The group was said to include health care professionals, local public health officials, labor leaders, local elected officials, among others.
