= Hialeah Hospital =

- Medical Properties Trust

Geography
- Location: 651 East 25th Street, Hialeah, Miami-Dade, Florida
- Coordinates: 25.845821°N 80.268793°W

Organisation
- Care system: Medicare (US), Medicaid
- Type: Acute Care

Services
- Standards: The Joint Commission
- Emergency department: Yes
- Beds: 378

Links
- Website: https://www.hialeahhosp.com/

Hialeah Hospital is a 378-bed acute care hospital started by Seventh-day Adventist physicians based on the health and Christian principles advocated by the Seventh-day Adventist Church, with the motto: "Christian Care Through Modern Medical Science." It is located in Hialeah, Florida with a medical staff of over 900 employees. It has grown to be one of the largest private hospitals in Florida. Hospital services include a Senior ER and an Acute Care for the Elderly (ACE) unit.

Hialeah Hospital is currently owned by Medical Properties Trust and operated by Healthcare Systems of America, which took control from Steward Health Care on an interim basis to keep the hospital open amid Steward's bankruptcy.

== History ==
In 1951, the hospital opened in Hialeah in northwest Miami-Dade County, Florida. A Seventh-day Adventist minister, Elder W. 0. Reynolds, then pastor of the Miami Temple church, bought a block of land, with a down payment of $5,000 and a mortgage for $45,000. The hospital was set up in the largest of three buildings on the property, with doctors' offices, laboratory and X ray and maternity in the others.

The medical staff began with Dr. Laurin Lundy Andrews, an Adventist physician who had been the superintendent of the Florida Sanatorium and Benevolent Association facility in Orlando and Dr. Albert. W. McCorkle, whose home was Lake Worth, Florida, and began his practice at the Hialeah Hospital in November, 1951.

By 1956 the original 30-bed capacity was inadequate, and financial resources were sufficient to begin a program of expansion. At that time, six additional patient rooms were added, increasing the total capacity to 50 beds. The addition included a large main nursing station and a surgery unit consisting of three operating rooms and a central supply room. The doctors' building, which houses the offices and examining rooms of four physicians, was built at the same time.

As dramatic growth elevated Hialeah to the eighth-largest city in the State of Florida, Hialeah Hospital has grown to be one of the largest privately owned hospitals in the state. Due to the rapid influx of Hispanic-Americans, the hospital became largely bilingual in both Spanish and English.

Hialeah Hospital was acquired from Tenet Healthcare, which had owned it for over three decades, by Steward Health Care in August 2021.

On May 5, 2024, The Wall Street Journal reported that Steward Health Care was expected to file for Chapter 11 bankruptcy protection within the coming days, blaming rising costs, insufficient revenue and cash crunches as part of the decision. Steward's bankruptcy is set to be one of the largest hospital bankruptcies in U.S. history, and the largest one in decades. The next day, Steward announced that it had indeed filed voluntarily for Chapter 11 bankruptcy protection. The company stressed that its hospitals and medical offices would remain open during the proceedings. In its press release, Steward stated it was finalizing terms of a $75 million in new debtor-in-possession financing from MPT, with the possibility for $225 million more if it meets certain unspecified conditions set by MPT. The company's filing papers list that more than 30 of its creditors owe about $500 million, and the U.S. government is owed $32 million to the federal government in "reimbursements for insurance overpayments".

== Services ==
Hialeah Hospital has served central to north Miami-Dade County since 1951. Hialeah Hospital offers a broad range of health care services, including 24-hour emergency care, cardiology, neurosurgery, obstetrics, a Level II Neonatal Intensive Care Unit, laboratory, a surgical weight loss program that has been designated a Center of Excellence by the American Society for Bariatric Surgery, and a complement of imaging services.

Hialeah Hospital received the Get With The Guidelines®–Heart Failure Gold Performance Achievement Award from the American Heart Association, which signifies that Hialeah Hospital has reached an aggressive goal of treating heart failure patients with 85% compliance for at least 24 months to core standard levels of care as outlined by the American Heart Association/American College of Cardiology secondary prevention guidelines for heart failure patients. Hialeah Hospital is fully accredited by the Joint Commission on the Accreditation of Healthcare Organizations, the nation's oldest and largest hospital accreditation agency. Services Include:

- Heart Care
- Acute Care Unit for the Elderly
- Sleep Disorders
- Surgery
- 24-hour Emergency Services,
- Women's Services
- Imaging
- Weight Loss Surgery Program
- Maternity Care
