= North Shore Medical Center (Miami) =

North Shore Medical Center Miami
- Medical Properties Trust
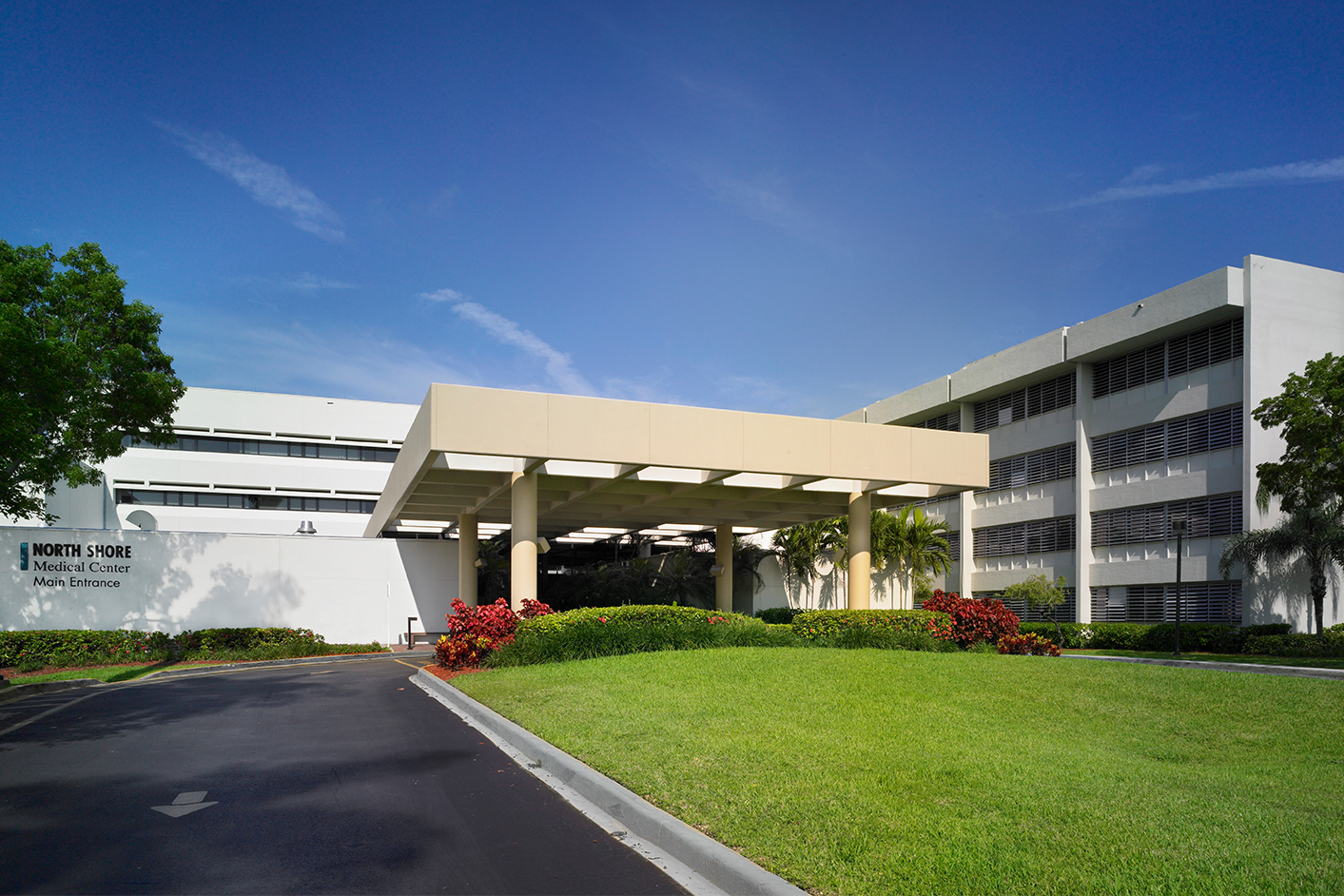

Geography
- Location: 1100 NW 95th St, Miami, Florida, United States
- Coordinates: 25.859640°N 80.214348°W

Services
- Standards: The Joint Commission (JCAHO)
- Beds: 357

History
- Opened: 1953

Links
- Website: www.northshoremedical.com
- Lists: Hospitals in Florida

North Shore Medical Center (Miami) is a thrombectomy capable stroke center in Miami, Florida. The hospital has more than 200 medical staff and over 500 employees. The hospital serves over 60,000 patients annually.

North Shore Medical Center is Florida's first Joint Commission (JCAHO)-accredited chest pain center as well as the first thrombectomy-capable stroke center in Miami Dade. The hospital is also fully accredited by the JCAHO, the nation's oldest and largest hospital accreditation agency.

North Shore Medical Center is currently owned by Medical Properties Trust and operated by Healthcare Systems of America, which took control from Steward Health Care on an interim basis to keep the hospital open amid Steward's bankruptcy.

== Facilities ==
North Shore Medical Center has 357 beds dedicated to emergency care, stroke care, cardiovascular care, orthopedics, bariatric surgery, diagnostic imaging, elderly care, general surgery, neurology, blood conservation, obstetrics, pain management, physical therapy, psychology, sleep study and wound care services. It has a cardiac cath lab, a comprehensive breast institute and a cancer center equipped with EDGE radiosurgery technology.

As a comprehensive stroke center, the hospital also treats patients with severe acute ischemic strokes using an advanced surgical approach.

Owned by Dallas-based Tenet Healthcare, it began to operate in 1953. In December 2020, Tenet sold North Shore Medical Center to Steward Health Care.

On May 5, 2024, The Wall Street Journal reported that Steward Health Care was expected to file for Chapter 11 bankruptcy protection within the coming days, blaming rising costs, insufficient revenue and cash crunches as part of the decision. Steward's bankruptcy is set to be one of the largest hospital bankruptcies in U.S. history, and the largest one in decades. The next day, Steward announced that it had indeed filed voluntarily for Chapter 11 bankruptcy protection. The company stressed that its hospitals and medical offices would remain open during the proceedings. In its press release, Steward stated it was finalizing terms of a $75 million in new debtor-in-possession financing from MPT, with the possibility for $225 million more if it meets certain unspecified conditions set by MPT. The company's filing papers list that more than 30 of its creditors owe about $500 million, and the U.S. government is owed $32 million to the federal government in "reimbursements for insurance overpayments".

== Recognition ==
North Shore Medical Center received America's 100 Best Hospitals for Prostate Surgery Award in 2020 from Healthgrades. It was also recognized as a high-performing hospital in the U.S. News & World Report 2019–2020 ratings for Chronic Obstructive Pulmonary Disease and Heart Failure Care.

Other honors of North Shore Medical Center include:

- Patient Safety Excellence Award (2018-2019) by Healthgrades
- American Heart/American Stroke Association's Heart Association "Get With the Guidelines ® - Heart Failure Quality Achievement Award in 2018 and 2019
- Get with the Guidelines® Target: Stroke Honor Roll-Elite Plus Gold Plus Quality Achievement Award in 2019
- Labor and Delivery Excellence Awards (2017-2018) by Healthgrades
- Leapfrog Hospital Safety Grade A for Fall 2017 and Spring 2018
- Obstetrics and Gynecology Excellence Award (2017) by Healthgrades
- Outstanding Improvement in Patient Satisfaction, Tenet Hospital Strategy Conference Awards 2017
