= UĦM Voice of the Workers =

Maltese trades union

UĦM Voice of the Workers is a Maltese trades union which organises staff in health and social care. It changed its name from Union Ħaddiema Magħqudin in 2015.

Only 45% of the Maltese workforce is unionised. The union advocates mandatory trade union membership for low income workers. It also campaigns against outsourcing.

It supported a doctors strike against the transfer of hospitals to Steward Global Healthcare and a dispute by public healthcare pharmacists demanding better training opportunities, both happening during January 2018.
