= North Shore Medical Center =

North Shore Medical Center may refer to:

- North Shore Medical Center (Miami), a hospital in Miami, Florida
- Salem Hospital (Massachusetts), formerly "North Shore Medical Center"
- North Shore University Hospital, a NorthShore University HealthSystem hospital in Manhasset, New York
- Royal North Shore Hospital, a hospital in New South Wales
