= Sharon Regional Health System =

For-profit health care service provider based in Sharon, Pennsylvania

Sharon Regional Health System is a for-profit health care service provider based in Sharon, Pennsylvania. Its main hospital is located in Sharon; additionally, the health system operates schools of nursing and radiography; a comprehensive pain management center across the street from its main hospital; clinics in nearby Mercer, Greenville, Hermitage, and Brookfield, Ohio; and Sharon Regional Medical Park in Hermitage.

On May 5, 2024, The Wall Street Journal reported that the hospital's parent Steward Health Care was expected to file for Chapter 11 bankruptcy protection within the coming days, blaming rising costs, insufficient revenue and cash crunches as part of the decision. Steward's bankruptcy is set to be one of the largest hospital bankruptcies in U.S. history, and the largest one in decades. The next day, Steward announced that it had indeed filed voluntarily for Chapter 11 bankruptcy protection. The company stressed that its hospitals and medical offices would remain open during the proceedings. In its press release, Steward stated it was finalizing terms of a $75 million in new debtor-in-possession financing from MPT, with the possibility for $225 million more if it meets certain unspecified conditions set by MPT. The company's filing papers list that more than 30 of its creditors owe about $500 million, and the U.S. government is owed $32 million to the federal government in "reimbursements for insurance overpayments".

In early 2025, following Steward Health Care’s bankruptcy and the temporary closure of the facility in January, the hospital reopened under new ownership. The Tenor Health Foundation acquired the site and restored inpatient services when the hospital reopened on March 18, 2025. A ribbon-cutting ceremony held in May marked the unveiling of a new name and logo. The health system also opened an off-site laboratory while awaiting the full reopening of the Cath Lab.

With nearly 1,800 employees, Sharon Regional is Mercer County's largest employer.

== Related links ==
- Sharon Regional Medical Center website
