= Caritas Christi Health Care =

US Catholic healthcare system

- Company type: Private
- Industry: Healthcare
- Founded: 1985; 41 years ago
- Defunct: 2010
- Successor: Steward Health Care System
- Headquarters: Boston, Massachusetts, US
- Area served: New England
- Key people: Ralph de la Torre (CEO/president)
- Number of employees: 12,000
- Website: https://caritaschristi.org

Caritas Christi Health Care was a non-profit Catholic healthcare system in the New England region of the United States. It was established in 1985 and was the second largest healthcare system in New England. In 2010, Caritas Christi was sold to the private equity firm Cerberus Capital Management, which converted it to a for-profit company and renamed it Steward Health Care System. Cain Brothers acted as Caritas Christi's advisor for this transaction, for which they received Deal of the Year honors from Investment Dealer's Digest.

Caritas Christi was an integrated healthcare network providing community based medicine and tertiary care in eastern Massachusetts, southern New Hampshire and Rhode Island. Caritas Christi Health Care had 12,000 employees, 1,552 hospital beds, 2,305 doctors, 1,880 nurses, 73,546 annual inpatient discharges, 238,551 annual emergency department visits and fifty five communities served.

Caritas Christi Health Care was led by President/CEO Ralph de la Torre, MD and located within the St. Elizabeth's Medical Center campus.

== Hospitals ==
Hospital	Location	Bed count	Emergency Department	Founded	Notes	Website
St. Elizabeth's Medical Center	Brighton	317		1868	Founded by Third Order of St. Francis	
Carney Hospital	Dorchester	230		1863	Founded by Daughters of Charity of Saint Vincent de Paul and Andrew Carney. First Catholic hospital in New England.	
Good Samaritan Medical Center	Brockton	231		1993	Merger of Cardinal Cushing General Hospital and Goddard Memorial Hospital	
Holy Family Hospital	Methuen	254		1950	Formerly Bon Secours Hospital	
Norwood Hospital	Norwood	264		1902	Formerly Willett Cottage Hospital	
Saint Anne's Hospital	Fall River	160		1906	Founded by Dominican Sisters of the Presentation	

In 1998, Caritas Christi acquired St. Joseph Health Services of Rhode Island.

== Other facilities ==
Non-acute Caritas Christi facilities which offered a variety of services included Caritas Home Care, Caritas Good Samaritan Hospice, Caritas Labouré College, Caritas St. Mary's Women and Children's Center, Caritas Por Cristo, and the Caritas Physician Network.
