= Morton Hospital and Medical Center =

Hospital in Massachusetts, US

Morton Hospital
- Brown University Health
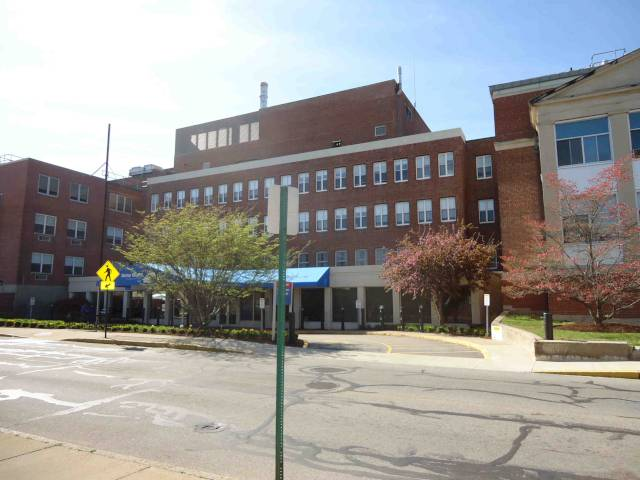
- Side entrance, Morton Hospital

Geography
- Location: Taunton, Massachusetts, USA
- Coordinates: 41°54′20.6″N 071°05′42″W

Organisation
- Type: Community

Services
- Standards: Joint Commission
- Emergency department: Yes
- Beds: 93

Helipads
- Helipad: (FAA LID: 1MA9)
Number	Length		Surface
Number	ft	m	Surface
H1	40	12	Asphalt

History
- Founded: January 3, 1889

Links
- Website: www.brownhealth.org/locations/morton-hospital

Morton Hospital is a medical complex located on 88 Washington Street near Route 140 and Route 138 in Taunton, Massachusetts, USA. The facility serves the Greater Taunton Area and is equipped with its own heliport for medical emergency flights. Also, it owns a small rehabilitation facility down the street at Mill River Plaza. Morton is a part of Brown University Health, a non-profit health care system based in Rhode Island which took over the hospital in 2024 from Steward Health Care, its previous operator, which was forced to sell its Massachusetts hospitals following its bankruptcy.

== History ==
After former Massachusetts Governor Marcus Morton died in 1864, his home was given to the City of Taunton to become the city’s first hospital. The Taunton Hospital Company was incorporated on June 8, 1888. In 1914, the name of the corporation was changed to Morton Hospital. In the 20th century, the hospital administered its own nursing school.

In 2011, the hospital was acquired by Steward Health Care in a $170 million deal. The transaction was approved by the Massachusetts Attorney General, the state's Department of Public Health, and the Supreme Judicial Court.

On May 6, 2024, Steward filed voluntarily for Chapter 11 bankruptcy protection. The company's filing said Steward had more than 100,000 creditors and liabilities of between $1 billion and $10 billion.

On October 1, 2024, Brown University Health officially took over the hospital from Steward.

== Heliport ==
The Morton Hospital Heliport (FAA LID: 1MA9) is a heliport composed of one helipad on the roof of Morton Hospital. The heliport is privately owned and is primarily used at the utmost discretion of the hospital for medical emergency airlifts and transport. Most often, critically injured patients are airlifted from the hospital to large and well-equipped medical facilities around the region; sometimes as far as Massachusetts General Hospital in Boston.

The heliport is made of asphalt and its dimensions are 40 x 40 ft / 12.2 x 12.2 m.

== See also ==
- Greater Taunton Area
- Taunton, Massachusetts
