= Nashoba Valley Medical Center =

Hospital in Ayer, Massachusetts

- Steward Health Care System

Geography
- Location: 200 Groton Road, Ayer, Massachusetts, United States
- Coordinates: 42°34′38.2″N 71°34′26.1″W

Organization
- Type: Community

Services
- Emergency department: Yes
- Beds: 73

Helipads
- Helipad: (FAA LID: 1MA1)
Number	Length		Surface
Number	ft	m	Surface
H1	40	12	Concrete

History
- Founded: 1964
- Closed: August 31, 2024

Links
- Website: www.nashobamed.org
- Lists: Hospitals in Massachusetts

Nashoba Valley Medical Center was a 46-bed community hospital located in Ayer, Massachusetts. In 1994, Deaconess Hospital of Boston purchased what was then called Nashoba Community Hospital. The hospital was purchased by Essent Healthcare in 2001, and sold to Steward Health Care System in 2011.

On May 6, 2024, Steward Health Care filed for Chapter 11 bankruptcy protection, raising uncertainty for the hospital's future. Over the next several months, Steward began searching for potential buyers for all of its hospitals across the country through court-guided auctions. Despite reports from state government that Steward had received bids for all of its hospitals in Massachusetts, the system reported in late July that Nashoba Valley Medical Center, along with Carney Hospital in Boston, would close on or around August 31 having received no "qualified bids." This was met with resistance by the public and government officials who planned to fight the hospital's closure, with emphasis specifically on the planned closure date being at odds with state requirements of 120 days' notice of any cessation of essential health services. On August 1, 2024, a Texas bankruptcy judge approved for the closure of Carney Hospital and Nashoba Valley Medical Center.

Ultimately, Nashoba Valley Medical Center closed its doors on the morning of August 31, 2024. On January 22, 2025, it was reported that UMass Memorial Health would be opening an emergency department that would replace the former Nashoba Valley Medical Center.
