= Boston Medical Center – Brighton =

Hospital in Boston, Massachusetts

- BMC Health System

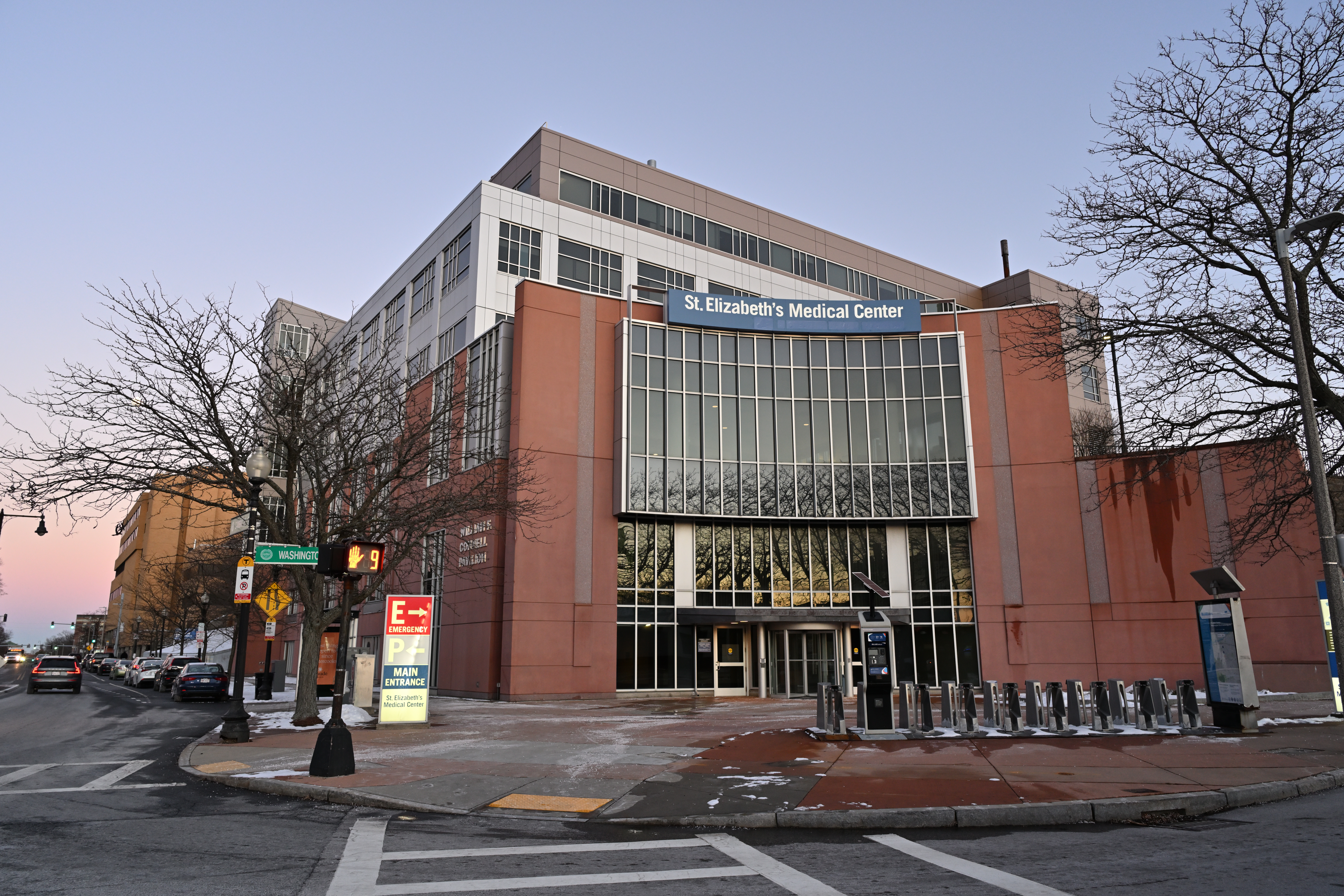
- Boston Medical Center - Brighton

Geography
- Location: Brighton, Boston, Massachusetts, United States
- Coordinates: 42.3491°N 71.1486°W

Organization
- Care system: Private
- Type: Teaching
- Affiliated university: Boston University School of Medicine

Services
- Standards: Joint Commission
- Emergency department: Yes
- Beds: 326: Bus 57, 65, 501; Green Line B

History
- Former names: St. Elizabeth's Hospital for Women; St. Elizabeth's Medical Center
- Opened: 1868

Links
- Website: www.bmchealthsystem.org/bmc-brighton
- Lists: Hospitals in Massachusetts

Boston Medical Center – Brighton (BMC Brighton) (formerly St. Elizabeth's Medical Center) is a non-profit teaching and academic hospital located in the Brighton neighborhood of Boston, Massachusetts. A major teaching affiliate of Boston University School of Medicine and continued affiliation with Tufts University School of Medicine. BMC Brighton is a part of Boston Medical Center Health System, a non-profit health care system. Recognized as "High Performing" by U.S. News & World Report in heart attack treatment, heart arrhythmia, heart bypass surgery, aortic valve surgery, and pacemaker implantation.

== History ==
Originally named St. Elizabeth's Hospital for Women, the hospital was founded in 1868 by five laywomen of the Third Order of Saint Francis at its original site in the South End neighborhood of Boston.

Established to primarily attend to medical needs specific to the poor and elderly women of Boston, the hospital was an early pioneer in the field of gynecology. The new hospital saw plenty of use, with its approximately thirty beds "always filled." In 1882, the hospital's charter was amended to allow for the care of men.

In 1884, Boston Archbishop John Joseph Williams invited the Franciscan Sisters of Allegany to take over operations at the hospital. The Sisters' tenure would last until 1965 and would see the hospital's 1914 move to its current location in Brighton, its expansion into several varied specialties, and the beginning of its development as a teaching hospital.

In 2010, St. Elizabeth's was converted into a for-profit hospital when its parent organization, Caritas Christi Health Care, was purchased from the Archdiocese of Boston by private equity firm Cerberus Capital Management, becoming one of the original members and the flagship hospital of the newly created Steward Health Care System. Steward sold much of their hospitals' real estate, including that of St. Elizabeth's, to real estate investment trust Medical Properties Trust in 2016 in a sale-leaseback deal, providing the hospital system with $1.25 billion used both to pay hundreds of millions of dollars in dividends to investors and to fund a nationwide expansion of the healthcare system. This deal, which imposed large lease payments on the affected hospitals, would largely be blamed for St. Elizabeth's - and the whole system's - financial crisis in the 2020s.

The 2020s saw escalating difficulties in hospital operations and finances. In December 2023, St. Elizabeth's was sued by the Department of Justice for violations of the False Claims Act and Stark Law in regards to allegations of improper referrals and Medicare billings from its cardiac surgery program. In 2023 and 2024, financial difficulties across the Steward Health Care System led to reports of unpaid vendors, missed rent payments, and inadequate supplies, including at St. Elizabeth's, where several lawsuits related to unpaid bills were filed in those years. Staff at the hospital reported vendors refusing to continue supplying the hospital with various supplies due to unpaid invoices, and contracted staff departing after months working without pay. One significant event took place in December 2023, when a new mother admitted to St. Elizabeth's following delivery died of a liver bleed. According to reports, when doctors tried to treat her by using an embolism coil, they discovered that the devices needed had been repossessed several weeks earlier. The manufacturer later explained to staff that the repossession was due to outstanding invoices which had gone unpaid by Steward.

Amid these financial difficulties, Steward Health Care in January 2024 informed state lawmakers of its intention to sell at least four of its Massachusetts hospitals to other operators, including St. Elizabeth's.

On May 5, 2024, The Wall Street Journal reported that Steward Health Care was expected to file for Chapter 11 bankruptcy protection within the coming days, blaming rising costs, insufficient revenue and cash crunches as part of the decision. Steward's bankruptcy is set to be one of the largest hospital bankruptcies in U.S. history, and the largest one in decades. The next day, Steward announced that it had indeed filed voluntarily for Chapter 11 bankruptcy protection. The company stressed that its hospitals and medical offices would remain open during the proceedings. In its press release, Steward stated it was finalizing terms of a $75 million in new debtor-in-possession financing from MPT, with the possibility for $225 million more if it meets certain unspecified conditions set by MPT. The company's filing papers list that more than 30 of its creditors owe about $500 million, and the U.S. government is owed $32 million to the federal government in "reimbursements for insurance overpayments".

In August 2024, Massachusetts Governor Maura Healey announced that, following stalled negotiations for Boston Medical Center to purchase the hospital, the state would seize the hospital through eminent domain to facilitate the transfer of ownership. The state offered $4.5 million to Apollo Global Management, the owner of the property, as their estimate of fair market value. Apollo rejected this offer in a letter to the state, citing property records assessing it at a value of more than $200 million. Apollo's letter stated in part, "There are a number of highly valuable changed uses to the property that would be similarly valuable for the community and for which a developer or educational institution would likely obtain permits." On September 27, 2024, the Commonwealth of Massachusetts formally seized control of the hospital, intending to transition operation of the hospital to the non-profit Boston Medical Center. After control was seized, Apollo announced that it intended to challenge the use of eminent domain, saying that the property was taken "for a fraction of the assessed value" and was taken unconstitutionally. Ultimately the Commonwealth and Apollo settled at the end of July 2025, agreeing on a purchase price of $66 million.

On October 1, 2024, BMC Health System officially took over the hospital from Steward. Due to the separation of the hospital from Steward's previous arrangements with the Archdiocese, BMC was required to remove all Catholic references from the hospital, including changing its name. On May 1, 2025, the system announced that the hospital would be renamed Boston Medical Center – Brighton.

== Operations ==
BMC Brighton is a teaching hospital affiliated with the Boston University Chobanian & Avedisian School of Medicine since 2021, previously affiliated with Tufts University School of Medicine.

It discharged more than 12,000 patients in 2022, accounting for 1.7% of discharges in Massachusetts that year. As of 2022, the hospital had 326 licensed beds, and operated with total revenue of $445.7 million. The hospital is designated by the Commonwealth of Massachusetts as a "high public payer" hospital, measured by the ratio of revenues from "public pay" patients (i.e. those covered by Medicare or Medicaid) versus those covered by commercial health insurance.

== See also ==
- List of hospitals in Massachusetts
