= Carney Hospital =

Hospital in Boston, Massachusetts (1863–2024)

Coordinates: 42.2774°N 71.0653°W

- Steward Health Care System

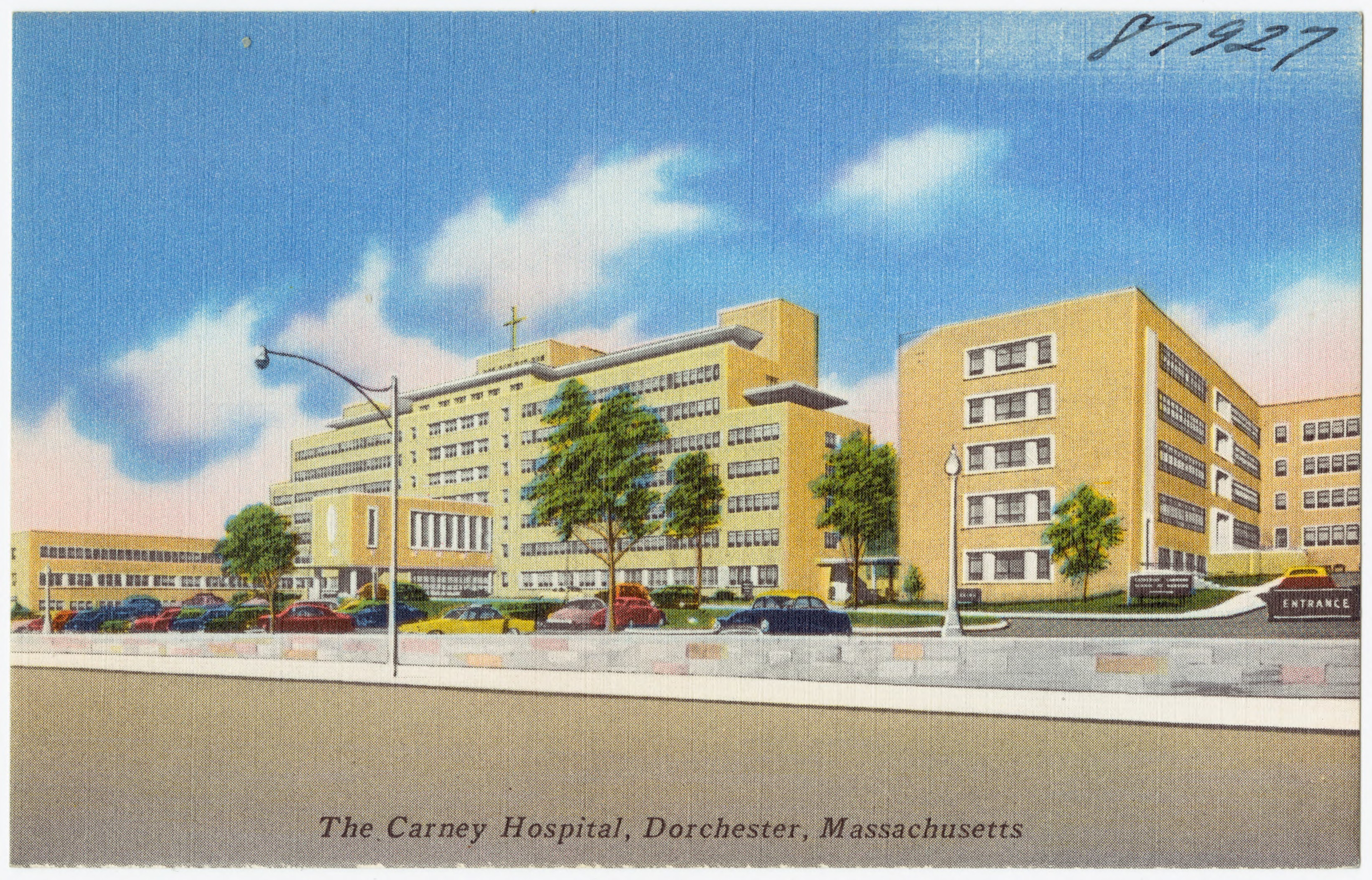

Geography
- Location: Dorchester, Boston, Massachusetts, United States

Organization
- Care system: Private
- Type: Teaching
- Affiliated university: Tufts University School of Medicine

Services
- Emergency department: Yes
- Beds: 159 (2022)

Helipads
- Helipad: Formerly

History
- Opened: 1863
- Closed: August 31, 2024

Links
- Website: www.carneyhospital.org
- Lists: Hospitals in Massachusetts

Carney Hospital was a small for-profit community teaching hospital located in the Dorchester neighborhood of Boston, Massachusetts. It was owned and operated by Dallas-based Steward Health Care.

The hospital had its beginnings in 1863 in South Boston. It was the first Catholic hospital in New England. Among its first patients were American Civil War soldiers. In 1892 a Carney Hospital team performed the first abdominal surgery in Boston.

In 2022, Carney Hospital was licensed for 159 beds, 91 of which were staffed, and discharged 3,119 inpatients. It operated with total revenues of $98 million, and with a deficit of $22.6 million.

== History ==
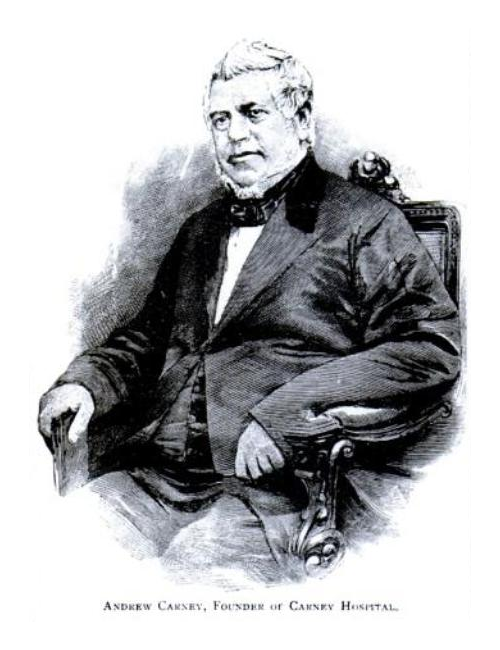
Andrew Carney (1794–1864), founder of the Carney Hospital

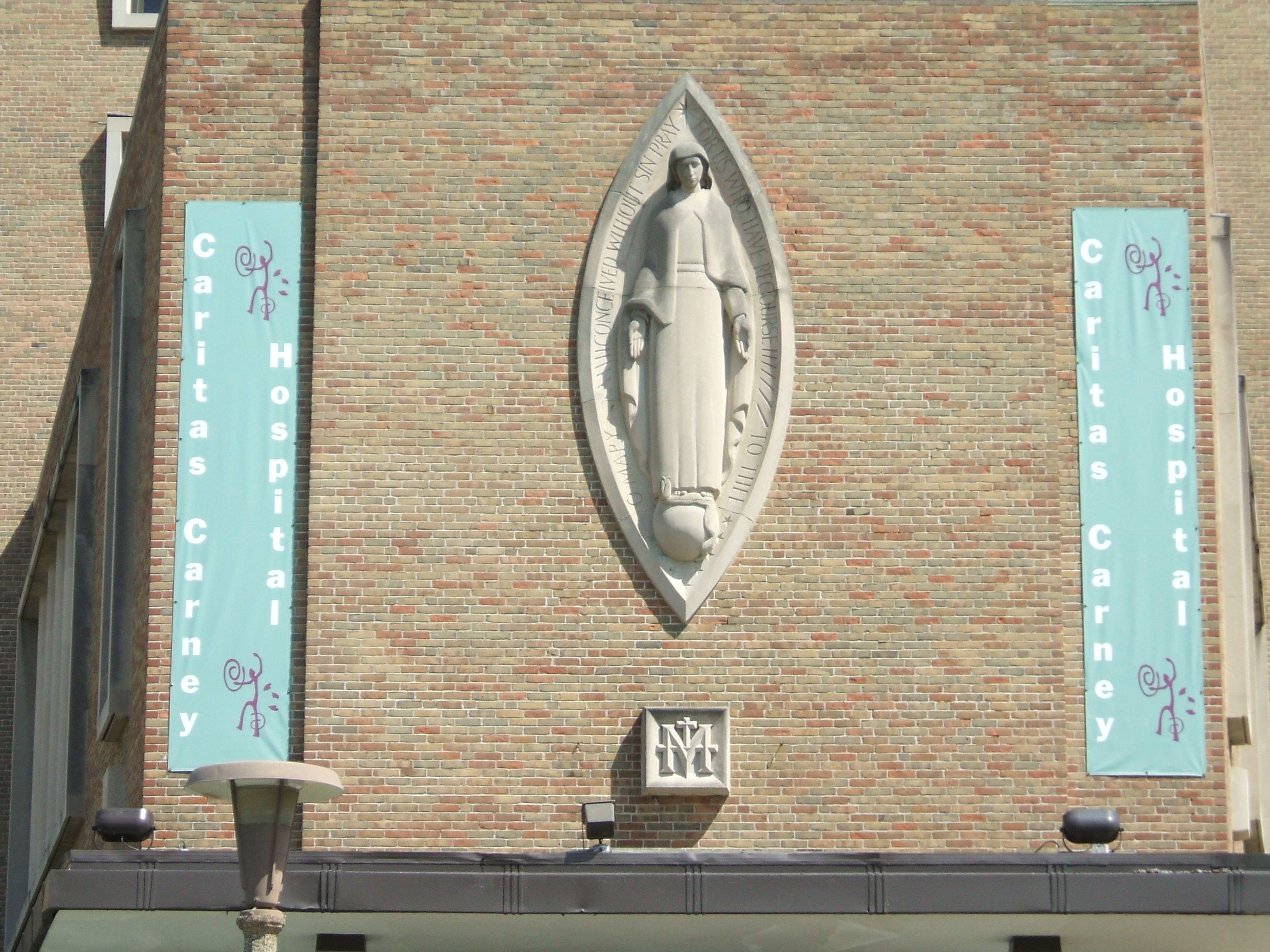
Relief of the Miraculous Medal on the facade of Carney Hospital (2006)

Carney Hospital was established in 1863 in South Boston by Andrew Carney with a $75,000 donation and with Sister Ann Alexis Shorb, Carney's choice for its first administrator and a member of the Daughters of Charity of St. Vincent de Paul. It was located on the former Hall Jackson Howe estate on Old Harbor Street on Telegraph Hill. The hospital's main building was designed by architect Charles J. Bateman and completed in 1891.

The 40-bed hospital was the first Catholic hospital in New England. In 1877, the first outpatient department in Boston was established by the hospital in two adjacent houses, followed by the first skin clinic in Boston in 1891. The first abdominal surgery in USA was carried out in the hospital by John Homans in 1882. The same year, the first ovariectomy in Boston was carried out in Carney by Henry I. Bowditch. The first Catholic nursing school in New England was opened in 1892.

In 1920 the hospital introduced its residency training programs. In 1950 the first plastic hip operation in the United States was performed by Dr. W.R. MacAusland at Carney Hospital. In 1953, the hospital moved from South Boston to its present location in Dorchester. The hospital became one of the first in USA to establish community health centers in 1973. Next year, Carney Hospital provided the first medical emergency rooftop helistop in Massachusetts. The hospital celebrated 125 years of service in 1988. After several months of deliberations, In 1997 the hospital became a member of the non-profit Caritas Christi Health Care group, the second largest health care system in New England, and was christened "Caritas Carney Hospital." Caritas Christi was purchased in 2010 by Cerberus Capital Management to create Steward Health Care System, marking the system's transition from non-profit to for-profit.

On May 6, 2024, Steward Health Care filed for Chapter 11 bankruptcy protection, raising uncertainty for Carney Hospital's future. Over the next several months, Steward began searching for potential buyers for all of its hospitals across the country through court-guided auctions. Despite reports from state government that Steward had received bids for all of its hospitals in Massachusetts, the system reported in late July that Carney Hospital, along with Nashoba Valley Medical Center in Ayer, would close on or around August 31 having received no "qualified bids." This was met with resistance by the public and government officials who planned to fight the hospital's closure, with emphasis specifically on the planned closure date being at odds with state requirements of 120 days' notice of any cessation of essential health services. However, on August 1, a Texas bankruptcy judge approved for the closure of Carney Hospital and Nashoba Valley Medical Center.

Ultimately, Carney Hospital closed its doors on the morning of August 31, 2024.

== In popular culture ==
Carney Hospital is mentioned in Philip Roth's alternative history novel The Plot Against America. While speaking to a crowd "at South Boston's busy Perkins Square," journalist Walter Winchell narrowly survives an assassination attempt and is "driven to Carney Hospital on Telegraph Hill," where he is treated "for facial wounds and minor burns."
