= New England Sinai Hospital =

Specialty hospital in Massachusetts

- Steward Health Care System

Geography
- Location: Stoughton, Massachusetts, United States
- Coordinates: 42.144574°N 71.098836°W

Organization
- Type: Specialist

Services
- Standards: Joint Commission
- Emergency department: No
- Beds: 203
- Speciality: Chronic care

History
- Former name: Jewish Tuberculosis Sanatorium
- Opened: 1936
- Closed: 2024

Links
- Website: www.newenglandsinai.org
- Lists: Hospitals in Massachusetts

New England Sinai Hospital was a for-profit chronic care specialty hospital located in Stoughton, Massachusetts. Founded in 1927 and opened in 1936 in Rutland, Massachusetts as the Jewish Tuberculosis Sanatorium, the facility changed its name and moved to Jamaica Plain in 1955 before settling in Stoughton in 1976. Originally non-profit, the hospital became for-profit when it was acquired by Steward Health Care in 2012.

Steward closed the hospital in 2024, citing financial issues it attributed to low insurance reimbursement rates. In 2022, the hospital had 203 beds and operated with revenues of $37.6 million at a loss of $11 million.

== History ==
The Jewish Tuberculosis Sanatorium of New England was founded in 1927 by Samuel Doxer, Harry Lukatch, Max Blender, and Fanny Bocholtz. The facility officially opened in Rutland, Massachusetts in 1936, with physician Moses J. Stone serving as its first chief of staff from its opening until his death in 1952. Though operated with Jewish values and amenities, the sanatorium was described as non-sectarian, accepting patients regardless of religious affiliation.

In 1952, the sanatorium was renamed New England Sinai Hospital. Outgrowing its original buildings, the hospital purchased land in Jamaica Plain and began fundraising to renovate and fit the building there for use as its new campus. $500,000 was raised, and the new facility opened in 1955.

In 1976, the hospital moved to its ultimate location in Stoughton. By this time, the hospital expanded from tuberculosis care and began offering rehabilitation and care for chronic conditions.

New England Sinai, facing a poor financial outlook, was acquired in 2012 by for-profit health system Steward Health Care. Steward promised to fund the hospital's pension and invest $13 million in upgrades to the facility, among other commitments. Amid revelations of extensive financial difficulties across its organization, Steward closed the hospital in April 2024, citing poor financial performance and low reimbursement rates.
