= Ralph de la Torre =

Former healthcare executive and cardiac surgeon

Ralph de la Torre M.D.
- Born: 1966 or 1967 (age 59–60)
- Education: Duke University (BSE); Harvard Medical School (MD); Massachusetts Institute of Technology (MS)
- Years active: 2008–present
- Title: Founder and CEO of Steward Health Care (2010–2024)
- Spouse: Nicole Acosta
- Children: 2
- Parents: Angel de la Torre; Rosa O. Valdes
- Medical career
- Profession: Surgeon
- Field: Cardiac surgery
- Institutions: Massachusetts General Hospital; Boston Medical Center; Beth Israel Deaconess Medical Center

Ralph de la Torre is a Cuban American former health care executive and cardiac surgeon. The CEO of Steward Health Care from 2010 to 2024, and previously CEO of its predecessor Caritas Christi Health Care starting in 2008, de la Torre also founded and served as the first head of Beth Israel Deaconess Medical Center's CardioVascular Institute from 2007 to 2008.

De la Torre is currently the subject of a congressional investigation into the financial mismanagement of Steward, which declared bankruptcy in May 2024.

== Early life and education ==
Ralph de la Torre grew up in Jacksonville, Florida, the son of Cuban immigrants fleeing from the Cuban Revolution. His parents were both of medical backgrounds, his mother a nurse and his father a cardiologist, once the head of internal medicine at General Calixto Garcia University Hospital in Havana.

De la Torre received a private school education at The Bolles School from 7th to 12th grade. He graduated from Duke University in 1988 with a Bachelor of Science in Engineering. After working for a short time in engineering, he attended a joint program administered by Harvard Medical School and the Massachusetts Institute of Technology, from which he earned his doctorate in medicine and masters in science. He received surgical training from Massachusetts General Hospital (MGH), where he met his first wife, Wing Cheung. De la Torre and Cheung later had twin sons together.

De la Torre's internship in surgery at MGH began in 1992, and he began his residency one year later. In 1997 he graduated and began a fellowship in thoracic surgery, remaining at MGH. He completed his two-year fellowship in 1999.

== Career ==
=== Cardiac surgeon ===
In 1999, de la Torre accepted a position at Boston Medical Center as a cardiac surgeon. He moved to Beth Israel Deaconess Medical Center (BIDMC) the next year. In 2007, he founded BIDMC's CardioVascular Institute, and acted as its first CEO until the next year. As a surgeon, de la Torre was regarded by many as ambitious and highly talented, and personally as someone with an affinity for luxury.

=== CEO of Caritas Christi Health Care ===
In 2008, in part with the help of former Partners Healthcare chairman Jack Connors, de la Torre secured a meeting with the new board of directors of Caritas Christi Health Care, a financially struggling eastern Massachusetts health system owned by the Archdiocese of Boston. Caritas' previous CEO had resigned in 2006 following allegations of misconduct. Amid its financial difficulties and following failed attempts to sell the hospital system to another operator, the Archdiocese created an independent board of directors which began its search for a new CEO. Following his interview with the board, Caritas offered de la Torre the position.

In 2009, de la Torre's Massachusetts medical license expired.

De la Torre spent his first year at Caritas restructuring the system, turning its finances from a loss of $20 million in 2008 to an income of $31 million in 2009, recovering from the 2008 financial crisis. Despite the short-term success, de la Torre believed Caritas' long-term prospects depended on a significant cash infusion—particularly to preserve jobs and fund the system's pension plan, which was uninsured and had been frozen due to lack of contributions by Caritas. De la Torre sought potential investors, and in 2009 met with Robert Nardelli, an executive at private equity firm Cerberus Capital Management and former CEO of Chrysler and Home Depot. Nardelli was impressed with de la Torre's energy and expertise, describing him as having a "tremendous edge." The conversation led to a formal proposition for Cerberus to purchase Caritas and convert the system to for-profit.

=== CEO of Steward Health Care ===
De la Torre continued at Steward in the same capacity as at Caritas. The transition of a hospital system to for-profit was not without controversy, especially in the context of Massachusetts, a state dominated by non-profit health systems. De la Torre was largely the public face of the company, though throughout his life he has given limited media interviews.

In 2020, de la Torre led a group of physicians in purchasing the entirety of Cerberus' stake in Steward. Cerberus exchanged its ownership for a convertible note, allowing it to collect interest with the option of converting it back into equity at a later date. The next year, Steward borrowed $335 million from its principal landlord, Medical Properties Trust, in order to buy out Cerberus' note in exchange for MPT acquiring a 10% stake in the company.

==== Steward bankruptcy ====
In July 2024, the United States Senate HELP Committee voted 16–4 to issue its first subpoena since 1981, compelling de la Torre to testify to his role in the financial collapse of Steward on September 12. This followed two declined invitations to testify voluntarily in April and June. However, in the first days of September, de la Torre's attorney responded to the subpoena on his behalf, describing the requested hearing as a "pseudo-criminal proceeding" aimed at convicting "Dr. de la Torre in the eyes of public opinion." He further requested the panel to reschedule the hearing, requesting that it be held off until after the company's bankruptcy had completed, as his testimony "may run afoul of the federal court order prohibiting him from discussing [...] mediation efforts." Despite this, the committee proceeded with the hearing. Consistent with his submitted response, de la Torre did not appear at the hearing as required. On September 19, the committee held two votes, one each for criminal and civil enforcement of the subpoena. Both resolutions passed in a unanimous 20–0 vote, sending them to the full Senate for a final vote. Only one senator, Rand Paul of Kentucky, abstained. In response to the votes, one of de la Torre's attorneys accused the committee of seeking to "frame Dr. de la Torre as a criminal scapegoat for the systemic failures in Massachusetts’ health care system." They further stated that de la Torre was barred from answering questions regarding Steward's bankruptcy by court order. The criminal contempt resolution passed in the Senate by unanimous consent on September 25. De la Torre again responded, alleging that the Senate was continuing "their violations of Dr. de la Torre’s constitutional rights, particularly those protected under the 5th Amendment of the US Constitution." The Senate HELP Committee first addressed de la Torre's Fifth Amendment concerns in a September 5 reply letter to his attorney, one week before the hearing:

Your letter suggests that it would be inappropriate to compel Dr. de la Torre to appear before the Committee because of his constitutional rights. The Fifth Amendment privilege against self-incrimination, however, does not permit witnesses to refuse to appear when summoned to testify before a congressional committee, but, rather, that constitutional privilege must be asserted by witnesses in declining to answer specific questions put to them. A valid assertion of the privilege [...] is predicated on a witness' good-faith determination that the provision of a truthful answer to a particular question creates a reasonable apprehension of incriminating him or her, and a witness cannot ultimately make the particular judgement necessary for invocation of the privilege except in consideration of a specific question. [...] The other matters raised in your letter are not cognizable legal grounds for your client's refusing to appear.

— Senators Bernie Sanders and Bill Cassidy, S. Rept. 118-230 - Proceeding Against Dr. Ralph de la Torre for Contempt of the Senate, September 5, 2024 letter to Alexander J. Merton, attorney for Ralph de la Torre

De la Torre submitted his resignation to the Steward Board of Directors in late September 2024, effective October 1. In a statement, his spokesperson said:

Dr. de la Torre urges continued focus on this mission and believes Steward's financial challenges put a much-needed spotlight on Massachusetts' ongoing failure to fix its healthcare structure and the inequities in its state system.

— September 29 statement from a spokesperson for de la Torre

== De La Torre v. Sanders et al ==
On September 30, 2024, de la Torre's last day as Steward CEO, de la Torre filed a lawsuit in federal court against the Senate HELP Committee and all but one of its members (Senator Rand Paul, the only member of the committee to abstain from the September 19 contempt vote [see below]), alleging that they were "collectively undertaking a concerted effort to punish Dr. de la Torre for invoking his Fifth Amendment right."

== Controversy and criticism ==
=== Implication in 2019 Malta political crisis ===
Following Steward's failed venture in Malta, an April 2024 Maltese magistrate report implicated Steward executives, including de la Torre, in an alleged bribery scheme involving multiple Maltese officials. Though magistrate's report recommended charges against de la Torre including those of bribery, fraud, and misappropriation, as of September 2024 Maltese officials have yet to formally charge him. However, CBS News reported in July that the office of the U.S. Attorney in Boston was investigating Steward as a whole for, among other things, violations of the Foreign Corrupt Practices Act. A Steward spokesperson later confirmed this, declining to comment further. Further, whistleblower Ram Tumuluri in September reported to the U.S. Congress that "de la Torre boasted that he could issue 'brown bags' [of cash] to government officials if necessary to close transactions." Steward publicly responded, saying that Steward Health Care International operated "in a lawful and transparent manner throughout the period in which the company was operating Malta." They further asserted that there was "no basis to accuse Dr. de la Torre of anything."

=== Role in alleged financial mismanagement of Steward Health Care ===
A Boston Globe Spotlight Team report on Steward Health Care, published in the months after Steward declared bankruptcy and authored in concert with the Organized Crime and Corruption Reporting Project (OCCRP), found several instances in the years leading up to the bankruptcy where under de la Torre's leadership, while patients were suffering injury and dying for reasons attributed by federal regulators to insufficient staffing and supply shortages related to unpaid bills, Steward was instead paying large sums on investor dividends, executive bonuses, private investigators, and non-business-related travel. At several junctures, the Globe and OCCRP found evidence of Steward capital being paid specifically to ventures owned by de la Torre or for what appeared to be personal benefit.

In one instance in 2022, de la Torre presented a $10 million donation to Greenhill School, a private preparatory school which his sons attended. According to the school, the donation, which funded the creation of a new science center to be named after de la Torre's mother, originated from the "de la Torre Family Foundation." However, no such foundation was found to have existed. Instead, tax filings found that the donation came from Steward Health Care, which donated $3 million more in 2023. Subsequently, the contract to manage construction of the science center went to CREF, a company in which de la Torre purchased a 40% stake in 2021 with funds from Steward International and which shared a Dallas office space with Steward. De la Torre sold his stake in CREF in August 2024.

In another instance according to bankruptcy filings, about $30 million per year was paid by Steward to Management Health Services (MHS) for "executive oversight and overall strategic directive." MHS, also part-owed by de la Torre, employed at one time 16 people, which included de la Torre and several other Steward executives, Robert Gendron, as well as the pilots for Steward's three private jets owned through MHS. De la Torre was in 2019 paid $6.3 million by MHS in a 10-month period.

MHS's jets were often found to be used for non-business travel, including to destinations such as San Jose, Costa Rica, where Steward had no official business but where de la Torre owned multiple residences, and to South Africa, where his family spent a week-long vacation. Additionally, Steward International purchased an apartment for de la Torre in Madrid for €8.1 million.

The Spotlight report highlighted the deaths of fifteen Steward patients attributable to supply and staffing shortages related to the system's financial state.

=== Contempt by Senate HELP Committee ===
The United States Senate HELP Committee unanimously voted to hold Dr. de la Torre in contempt for his failure to testify on the closure of Steward's hospitals and their financial situation pre-closure. Dr. de la Torre responded by suing the committee and each of its members (with the exception of Rand Paul, the only member to abstain).
