= W. R. MacAusland =

American physician

Dr. William Russell MacAusland (December 9, 1922 – January 15, 2004) was the Surgeon in Chief Orthopedic Department at the Carney Hospital in Boston. He held the distinction of performing the first plastic hip operation in the United States in 1950. He graduated from Harvard Medical School in 1903.
