= Kinderhook Industries =

American private equity firm

- Company type: Limited liability corporation
- Industry: Private equity
- Founded: 2003; 23 years ago
- Headquarters: New York City, United States
- Number of employees: 20
- Website: www.kinderhook.com

Kinderhook Industries, LLC is an American private equity firm based in New York City. Since 2003, the firm has raised over $5 billion under management and has made in excess of 300 investments.

Kinderhook partners with middle-market businesses.

In January 2020, Kinderhook Industries has closed its Kinderhook Capital Fund VI mid-market buyout fund at its $1 billion hard cap. Investors included the New York State Teachers' Retirement System, Albany. The previous fund, Kinderhook Capital Fund V, closed in 2016 at its hard cap of $750 million.

== Transactions ==
In 2014, Kinderhook acquired GlobalHealth and Thermacell.

In 2015, Kinderhook acquires Superwinch.

In 2015, Kinderhook buys Collision Diagnostic Services.

In 2015, Kinderhook invests in Bestop.

In 2015, Kinderhook acquires CSDVRS.

In 2015, Kinderhook acquires STC.

In 2016, Bestop acquires Baja Designs.

In 2016, Kinderhook acquires NTP.

In 2016, Kinderhook invests in NitroFill.

In 2016, Truck Hero adds Husky Liners to its aftermarket auto holdings.

In 2017, Stratus Video Grows Telehealth Division Following Investment from Kinderhook.

In 2017, Kinderhook exits San Jamar.

In 2017, ACV Enviro acquire Walker Industrial Services.

In 2017, Kinderhook forms Race Winning Brands and acquires PMI.

In 2017, Race Winning Brands acquires Diamond Pistons and Trend Performance.

In 2017, TCF Capital Funding Provides $15mm recap financing of NitroFill.

In 2018, Bestop acquires PRP Seats, Status Racing, and SpeedStrap.

In 2018, Race Winning Brands acquires Rekluse Motor Sports.

In 2018, Kinderhook acquires SCA Performance.

In 2018, Race Winning Brands acquires Dart Machinery.

In 2018, Race Winning Brands acquires Falicon Crankshaft Components.

In 2018, Race Winning Brands acquires MGP Connecting Rods.

In 2019, Race Winning Brands acquires CV4.

In 2019, SCA Performance acquired Rocky Ridge.

In 2019, SCA Performance acquired Rocky Mountain Truckworks.

In 2020, Race Winning Brands acquires Manley Performance Products, Inc.
