= Medical Properties Trust =

American real estate investment trust

Medical Properties Trust, Inc.
- Type: Public
- Traded as: NYSE: MPT; S&P 600 component
- Industry: Real estate investment trust Health care
- Predecessor: Medical Properties Trust, LLC
- Founded: August 27, 2003; 23 years ago
- Founder: Edward K. Aldag, Jr.
- Headquarters: Birmingham, Alabama, U.S.
- Key people: Edward K. Aldag, Jr. (Chairman & CEO); R. Steven Hamner (CFO)
- Revenue: ▼US$972 million (2025)
- Net income: ▲ -US$277 million (2025)
- Total assets: ▲US$15.001 billion (2025)
- Total equity: ▼US$4.607 billion (2025)
- Number of employees: 121 (2026)
- Website: www.medicalpropertiestrust.com

Medical Properties Trust, Inc. (MPT), headquartered in Birmingham, Alabama, is a real estate investment trust that invests in healthcare facilities.

As of December 31, 2025, the company owned interests in 384 facilities with a total of 39,000 beds in the United States (161 properties), United Kingdom (92 properties), Germany (85 properties), Switzerland (19 properties), Spain (9 properties), Italy (8 properties), Finland (4 properties), Colombia (4 properties), and Portugal (2 properties). The facilities are leased to a total of 50 tenants: general hospitals (59%), behavioral health facilities (16%), urgent care facilities (13%), and post-acute care facilities (11%). As of December 31, 2025, its largest tenants were Circle Health Group (14.7% of assets), Priory Group (8.7% of assets), Healthcare Systems of America (8.0% of assets), Swiss Medical Network (5.8% of assets), and Lifepoint Behavioral (5.4% of assets).

The company was criticized for its former relationship with Steward Health Care, in which it purchased properties from Steward at inflated prices and negotiated leaseback transactions at inflated rents, boosting the company's earnings in the short term and enriching its executives, while misappropriating funds from hospital budgets. Steward filed bankruptcy in 2024 and MPT severed its relationship with the company.

== History ==
=== 2003–2014 ===
The company was founded by Edward K. Aldag, Jr. and others on August 27, 2003, as successor to a previous venture, Medical Properties Trust, LLC, which was formed in Maryland in December 2002.

In July 2005, MPT became a public company via an initial public offering.

In late 2005, the company completed one of its first developments: Town & Country Hospital in Houston, Texas, at cost of $65 million; it was sold in 2007 to Memorial Hermann Health System for $70 million.

In 2012, MPT announced a $400 million deal to acquire a 49% stake in Albuquerque, New Mexico-based Ernest Health, as well as the underlying real estate of the health system's 16 rehabilitation and long-term acute care facilities in nine states. It sold the interest in May 2018.

In December 2013, MPT expanded internationally for the first time with the real estate purchase of eleven rehabilitation hospitals in Germany, operated by RHM Klinik- und Altenheimbetriebe (RHM), for €184 million.

In August 2014, the company acquired its first hospital in the United Kingdom, Circle Bath in Peasedown St John, for £28.3 million.

=== 2015–2019 ===
In July 2015, MPT purchased Capella Healthcare, operating in Tennessee, from GTCR for $900 million–$300 million for a portion of its operations, and $600 million for its real estate in a leaseback arrangement.

One year later, it sold its stake in Capella's operations to Apollo Global Management for $390 million; it was merged with RegionalCare. MPT continued to own the real estate.

In October 2016, MPT finalized the leaseback of five properties of Steward Health Care, a health system in Massachusetts based on a $1.25 billion asset value. In addition to properties, MPT acquired a 5% stake in Steward for $50 million.

In February 2017, MPT purchased properties from Steward for $301 million. In May 2017, the company completed a similar $1.4 billion transaction with Steward involving 10 facilities.

These and other similar leaseback transactions with Steward, which involved MPT loaning money to Steward for acquisitions, then charging inflated rents, were criticized for inflating MPT's income and executive compensation, while financially encumbering community hospitals.

By 2018, Steward represented 38% of MPT's real estate assets.

MPT entered the Australian healthcare market in 2019 with the purchase of eleven hospitals–seven acute care and four behavioral health–in a leaseback arrangement with Healthscope for $860 million.

Also in 2019, MPT purchased the real estate of fourteen facilities operated by Prospect Medical Holdings. Prospect filed for bankruptcy in January 2025; MPT was alleged to have to contributed to the demise of the company.

=== 2020–present ===
In 2020, MPT formed a joint venture with executives of Steward and acquired properties from Steward at inflated prices, using funds loaned by MPT.

In March 2022, Medical Properties Trust created a joint venture with Macquarie Group for 50/50 ownership of its portfolio of eight hospitals in Massachusetts, earning MPT $600 million.

In 2023, MPT sold its Australian portfolio to Sydney-based asset management company HMC Capital for $802 million, lower than its purchase price for the facilities.

Steward had financial trouble and by 2023, it was relying on circular funding from MPT to pay its rent obligations. In May 2024, Steward filed for bankruptcy protection. The company accused its founder, Ralph de la Torre and three others — Michael Callum, James Karam, and Sanjay Shetty — of defrauding the company of more than $245 million. As part of the bankruptcy, Steward terminated its master lease and severed its relationship with MPT; MPT leased hospitals formerly operated by Steward to other operators.

In April 2024, the company sold the majority of its interests in five Utah hospitals for $886 million.
