= Debtor-in-possession financing =

Special form of financing

Debtor-in-possession financing (DIP financing) is a special form of financing provided for companies in financial distress, typically during restructuring under corporate bankruptcy law (such as Chapter 11 bankruptcy in the US or CCAA in Canada). Usually, this debt is considered senior to all other debt, equity, and any other securities issued by a company — violating any absolute priority rule by placing the new financing ahead of a company's existing debts for payment.

DIP financing may be used to keep a business operating until it can be sold as a going concern, if this is likely to provide a greater return to creditors than the firm's closure and a liquidation of assets. It may also give a troubled company a new start, albeit under strict conditions. In this case, "debtor in possession" financing refers to debt incurred while in bankruptcy, and "exit financing" is debt incurred upon emerging from reorganisation under bankruptcy law.

== Examples ==
Two notable examples are the government financing of Chrysler and General Motors during their respective 2009 bankruptcies.

On January 20, 2026, asset management firm GoldenTree, founded by billionaire Steve Tananbaum, committed to buying a roughly $200 million ‌portion of the debtor-in-possession financing of troubled retailer Saks Global.

== American law vs. French law ==
The willingness of governments to allow lenders to place debtor-in-possession financing claims ahead of an insolvent company's existing debt varies; US bankruptcy law expressly allows this while French law had long treated the practice as soutien abusif, requiring employees and state interests be paid first even if the end result was liquidation instead of corporate restructuring.

== See also ==
- Debtor in possession
- Bankruptcy
- Bankruptcy alternatives
- Shareholder loan
- Seniority (financial)
- Bail out (finance)
- Default
- Distressed securities
- Insolvency
- Liquidation
