= Myrtelle Canavan =

American physician (1879-1953)

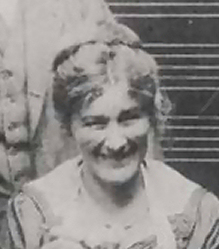
- Canavan in 1915
- Born: June 24, 1879; Greenbush Township, Clinton County, Michigan, United States
- Died: August 4, 1953 (aged 74); Boston, Massachusetts
- Education: Michigan State University, University of Michigan, and Women's Medical College of Pennsylvania
- Known for: First published description of Canavan disease
- Scientific career
- Fields: Medicine

Myrtelle May Moore Canavan (June 24, 1879 – August 4, 1953) was an American physician and medical researcher. She was one of the first female pathologists and is best known for publishing a description of Canavan disease in 1931.

== Life and career ==
Born in Greenbush Township, near St. Johns, Michigan, Canavan studied at (Michigan) State Agricultural College (now Michigan State University), the University of Michigan Medical School, and Women's Medical College of Pennsylvania, from which she received her M.D. in 1905.

In 1905 she married Dr. James F. Canavan.

In 1907 she was appointed assistant bacteriologist at Danvers State Hospital in Massachusetts, where she met Elmer Ernest Southard, Bullard Professor of Neuropathology at Harvard Medical School, who encouraged her interest in neuropathology. In 1910 she became resident pathologist at Boston State Hospital and in 1914 was appointed pathologist to the Massachusetts Department of Mental Diseases. She was also an instructor of neuropathology at the University of Vermont.

After Southard's death in 1920, Canavan became acting director of the laboratories of the Boston Psychopathic Hospital, which would later become the Massachusetts Mental Health Center. From 1920 until her retirement in 1945, she was an associate professor of neuropathology at Boston University and curator of the Warren Anatomical Museum at Harvard Medical School, where she added more than 1,500 specimens and also improved record-keeping and discarded damaged specimens. However, her official title was "assistant curator" because of objections to a woman heading the museum, and she was never appointed to the Harvard faculty.

Canavan died of Parkinson's disease in 1953.

== Research ==
Canavan's research focused on the effects of nervous system damage on the mind and body. She was also very interested in bacteriology; the first of the 79 articles she published was on bacillary dysentery and the first article she co-authored with Southard concerned bacterial invasions of blood and cerebrospinal fluid. She studied the pathology of diseases affecting the optic nerve, spleen, brain, and spinal cord, and she examined cases of sudden death, multiple sclerosis, and microscopic hemorrhage.

By prior agreement, she performed the autopsy on Frank Bunker Gilbreth, identifying the arteriosclerosis that had caused his death. And in 1925 she published Elmer Ernest Southard and His Parents: A Brain Study, a report on her examination of the brains of her mentor and his parents. She also trained neuropathologist Louise Eisenhardt, who became a renowned expert in diagnosing brain tumors. In 1959 she was credited with training 70% of the neurosurgeons then certified.

She had a particular interest in the neuropathology of mental illness. With Southard and others, she contributed to a monograph series called Waverley Researches in the Pathology of the Feeble-Minded.

She is most famous for a paper she co-wrote in 1931 discussing the case of a child who had died at sixteen months and whose brain had a spongy white section. Canavan was the first to identify this degenerative disorder of the central nervous system, which was later named "Canavan Disease."

== See also ==
- List of pathologists
