= Wicht Club =

Informal society of Harvard University lecturers (1903 to 1911)

The Wicht Club was an irreverent, self-assembling society of Harvard University lecturers. From 1903 to 1911 it met monthly for informal dialogue to advance the members' scientific thought and expression. Today it would be seen as a professional development organization, but this group had its mascot (Das Wicht) and other terms:

- Wichts : members
- Wichtinnen : members' wives
- Was Wichtiges : annual binding of members' scientific reprints

The use of German language indicated the exposure of the Wichts to the Humboldtian model of higher education.

== Meetings ==
The club met at a restaurant or hotel in Boston, going outside the stifling atmosphere of academic or domestic spaces. Records were not kept of the ordinary monthly meetings where a presentation may be interrupted or supplemented by audience comments. According to Frederick Parker Gay, "guests were invited, among them William James several times." Once a year the wives were invited to join the Wicht Club when the new volume of Was Wichtiges was presented. "The nine volumes … are a treasure trove of the work produced by young Harvard scientists and philosophers at the beginning of the twentieth century."

Walter B. Cannon described the Club in his autobiography, The Way of an Investigator:

George Pierce and Ralph Perry were members of the Wicht Club, an informal organization of young Harvard instructors that existed early in this century. The club was named from a picture in Simplicissimus, a little gnomelike, red-draped figure, standing in a niche at the roots of a huge tree and with inquiring eyes peering out from under its hood. It was labeled "Das Wicht". The Wicht Club met once a month at a Boston hotel and, in mingled seriousness and jocularity, listened to one of the members who told about recently developed phases of his academic interest. Annually, until they became too numerous, the reprints of our published papers were gathered and bound under the title Was Wichtiges.

== Members ==
- Elmer Ernest Southard, psychiatry
- Walter B. Cannon, physiology
- G. W. Pierce, physics
- Ralph Barton Perry, philosophy
- Gilbert N. Lewis, chemistry
- Robert M. Yerkes, primate biology
- Edwin Holt, psychology
- Harry W. Morse, physics
- Roswell P. Angien, psychology
- Wilmon H. Sheldon, philosophy

== Origin ==
Boston society was largely organized around social clubs. For students there were Harvard College social clubs. To connect with their peers and share research, these instructors, without access to the exclusive clubs of Boston families, formed their own club.

When G. W. Pierce and Harry W. Morse returned from their post-doctoral studies and travels in Europe, Pierce carried with him a copy of the German humor magazine Simplicissimus. A certain drawing of a gnome between the spreading roots of a great tree was labeled "Das Wicht". Any student of German knows that "Wichtigkeit" means "importance", but the root "Wicht" left room for these Harvard men to exercise themselves together in an unfettered way.
