= Marion Edwena Kenworthy =

American psychiatrist (1891-1980)

- Born: 1891; Hampden, Massachusetts, U.S.
- Died: 1980 (aged 88–89)
- Education: Tufts University School of Medicine
- Occupations: Psychiatrist, psychoanalyst
- Known for: Contributions to social work education and child psychiatry
- Awards: Agnes McGavin Purcell Award

Marion Edwena Kenworthy, M.D. (1891–1980), an American psychiatrist and psychoanalyst, introduced psychiatric and psychoanalytic concepts to the education of social workers and to the field of social work.

== Life ==
She was born in Hampden, Massachusetts. She entered Tufts Medical School in 1908 at the age of 17, and graduated cum laude with a medical degree in 1913. She accepted an appointment at the Gardner State Hospital in Massachusetts, the first woman ever on the hospital medical staff. After three years, she moved to the Foxborough State Hospital in Massachusetts. Her weekends and vacations were spent at the Boston Psychopathic Hospital (now the Massachusetts Mental Health Center), where she came into contact with Elmer Southard, a leading child psychiatrist. Among her colleagues were Karl Menninger, Harry Solomon, and Lawson Lowrey, leaders in the field of psychiatry.

Kenworthy moved to New York in 1919 to educate physical education teachers at the Central School of Hygiene of the Young Women's Christian Association (YWCA). She also worked on a research project at the Vanderbilt Clinic and the New York State Neurological Institute observing glandular problems of children. Here, she met Bernard Glueck who invited her to lecture at the New York School of Social Work (now the Columbia University School of Social Work). In 1921, she became assistant director of the Bureau of Child Guidance under Glueck. When he left in 1924, she assumed the directorship. The Bureau had been established as a demonstration clinic for the mental health problems of children. During her tenure, Kenworthy trained in psychoanalysis with Otto Rank. Kenworthy established her private practice in child and adult psychiatry. The Bureau closed in 1927.

Kenworthy was named an instructor in the Department of Mental Hygiene at the New York Social Work School in 1921. She became its director in 1924 and stayed until 1940, when she became professor of psychiatry. In 1956, she retired and awarded Emeritus status. A Chair was established in her honor and she was named a Trustee to the Board of Columbia University. In 1968, the Medical College of Pennsylvania awarded her an honorary D.M.S., and in 1973 she received an honorary D.S. from Columbia University. The American Psychiatric Association (APA) gave her its Agnes McGavin Purcell Award in 1971.

Kenworthy achieved a number of "firsts." She was the first elected woman vice president of the American Psychiatric Association (1965–1966), the first woman president of the American Psychoanalytic Association (1958–1959), president of the American Academy of Child Psychiatry (1959–1961), and president of the Group for the Advancement of Psychiatry (1959–1961).

Kenworthy contributed to the education of thousands of social workers and helped to professionalize the profession. She fostered child psychiatry as a specialization. She worked to integrate mental health concepts into the juvenile court system and adoption sources in New York City.

== Works ==
- 'Extra-medical Service in the Management of Misconduct Problems in Children', Mental Hygiene (1921): 724–735.
- 'The Mental Hygiene Aspects of Illegitimacy', Mental Hygiene (1921): 499–508.
- 'Training for Psychiatric Social Work', Hospital Social Service (1923): 32–37.
- 'The Problems of Personality in Disease', New York Medical Journal (1921): 211–214.
- 'Social Maladjustments (Emotional) in the Intellectually Normal', Proceedings of the International Congress of Mental Hygiene 2 (1932): 26–47.
- 'Some Emotional Problems Seen in the Superior Child', American Journal of Psychiatry 4 (1924–1925): 489–98.
- (with Porter R. Lee) Mental Hygiene and Social Work. New York: The Commonwealth Fund, 1929.
