= Non-Sectarian Committee for German Refugee Children =

Children's Aid Organisation

The Non-Sectarian Committee for German Refugee Children (NSCGRC) was an organization for the attempted rescue of children in the aftermath of the Kristallnacht pogrom. There were many influential members of society that hoped they could bring awareness to the people and lobbying efforts to get Congress to allow for 20,000 refugee children to enter the United States.

== History ==
When news of the Kristallnacht pogrom was reported Dr. Marion Kenworthy, Director of the Department of Mental Hygiene at the New York School of Social Work, who was a psychiatric social worker specializing in child psychiatry, had a meeting at her house on December 8, 1938. In attendance were Kenworthy, Lotte Marcuse and Cecilia Razovsky of the German Jewish Children's Aid (GJCA), and Clarence Pickett of the American Friends Service Committee (AFSC).

A following meeting on December 18, 1938, had a larger group of people that included Sophie Theis, who worked for the New York State Charities Aid Association and was the first adoption professional and researcher, Ruth Taylor, the Commissioner of Public Welfare for Westchester County, Mary Boretz, served as the head of the Hebrew Sheltering Guardian Society of New York's Home Bureau, a position she held since 1918. Others joining were Louis Weis, Helen Hall, Walter Petitt, Dr. Viola Bernard, Judge Lawrence Dunham, Benjamin Cohen, Nathan Strauss, Helen Strauss, Ben Namm, Mrs. George Backer, Agnes King Inglis, Elizabeth Meyer, Dr. Otto Nathan, Marion R. Stern, Dr. John Lovejoy Elliott, Paul Kellog, Rev. Bernard James Sheil; Rev. Anson Phelps Stokes; New York Governor Herbert H. Lehman, William Allen White the Pulitzer Prize winning Kansas City Editor, Helen Taft Manning the daughter of former President William Howard Taft and Dean of Bryn Mawr College, and Frank Porter Graham University of North Carolina President, resulting in the creation of the Non-Sectarian Committee for German Refugee Children.

Forty-nine church leaders petitioned President Theodore Roosevelt in support of a small number of refugee children to enter the United States. There would have to be an exemption, outside the quota allowed under law, for any bill to have a chance as there would be opposition.

== Wagner–Rogers Bill ==
The bipartisan Wagner–Rogers Bill, sponsored by Senator Robert F. Wagner (D-N.Y.) and Representative Edith Rogers (R-Mass.) was a result of the committee's work.

Eleanor Roosevelt supported the bill as conveyed to the Pittsburgh Press on February 13, 1939, but the president feared political embarrassment and there were remarks that there could be more rigorous immigration laws.

The United States House Judiciary Subcommittee on Immigration and Citizenship never reported the bill out.
