= Marion K. Sanders =

Marion Klein Sanders (14 August 1905, Lawrence, Long Island, New York – 16 September 1977, New York, New York) was an American journalist, editor, and writer.

== Education ==
She graduated from the Horace Mann School in New York, New York, in 1921 and from Wellesley College in 1925, from which she received an Alumnae Achievement Award in 1973. While at Wellesley, she edited the College's yearbook. She also attended the Columbia University Graduate School of Journalism.

== Professional ==
She began her career as a freelance journalist and a political speechwriter. Under the name Marion Klein she was a freelance feature writer for a small news syndicate, as a stringer for The Toronto Star, which published several pieces (November 1925), reviewed books for The Book Review (March 1926), performed minor editorial chores for the Theater Guild Quarterly for which she also wrote a piece (April 1926), wrote several piece for the Chicago Journal under the byline Marionette (May 29, 1926, June 9, 13, 20 and 27,1926). She also served as a rewrite person and translator (French, German, Italian) for Continental Features, Inc. In 1931 and 1932, she ghost wrote pieces for Howard S. Cullman, a commissioner of the Port of New York Authority.

She did assorted freelance writing and a year's graduate work at the Columbia School of Journalism until 1932 when she took a job as assistant to trustee and public relations director for the Roxy Theater, and later director of public relations Gaumont British Picture, Corp. until 1936 when she became assistant to chief, Bureau of Commerce (1941 title changed to Assistant Director, Public Relations) for the Port of New York Authority, making three documentary motion pictures, conducted a large scale educational program and wrote a large illustrated book on the Port of New York, plus many radio scripts, lectures, speeches, pamphlets, and annual reports. In 1939, she took a 6-month leave without pay to serve as Secretary and Director of Public Relations, Non-Sectarian Committee for German Refugee Children.

In 1944, she took a job as a news editor with the Overseas Branch of the Office of War Information, helping run its news service, which fed the overseas psychological warfare program. At the end of the war, she was Assistant Chief of the Publications Bureau, which published magazines in over 20 languages.

In 1946, she was hired to head the State Department's New York office, which would handle such publications to continue under the permanent overseas information program. She remained Chief, Magazine Branch, Division of International Press and Publications, Office of International Information, until 1952, as Editor-in-Chief of the magazine Amerika . In 1949 the office took over 4 German language magazines from the Army, and also published a History of the U.S. in 10 languages, including Korean and Urdu.

From 1958 until 1970, she was a senior editor of Harper's Magazine, where many of her investigative articles on women, medicine, politics, social welfare, and urban affairs appeared. She was later a managing editor of World Press Review.

In 1973, she wrote the first biography of Dorothy Thompson, Dorothy Thompson: A Legend in Her Time (Boston: Houghton Mifflin Company, 1973). After an unsuccessful run for Congress in the former 28th Congressional District of New York, including Rockland, Orange, Sullivan, and Delaware Counties, in 1952, she wrote,The Lady and the Vote (Boston: Houghton Mifflin Company, 1956). Other works include a series of conversations with Saul Alinsky entitled, The Professional Radical: Conversations with Saul Alinsky, (New York: Harper & Row, 1970), a work of fiction, The Bride Laughed Once co-written with Mortimer S. Edelstein (Farrar & Rinehart,1943), which received the Mary Roberts Rinehart award for mystery writing. She edited The Crisis in American Medicine(Harper and Row, 1961).

== Published articles for Harper's ==
- Enemies of Abortion March 1974
- Addicts and Zealots: The Chaotic War Against Drug Abuse. June 1970
- The Professional Radical:1970. January 1970
- The Sex Crusaders from Missouri. May 1968
- The Doctors Meet the People. January 1968
- The Several Worlds of American Jews. April 1966
- The Professional Radical. June 1966
- A Professional Radical Moves in on Rochester. July 1965.
- The New American Female: Demi-feminism Takes Over. July 1965
- Sweden's Remedy for "Police Brutality". November 1964
- The Next Mayor of New York? February 1963
- A Slight Case of Library Fever. April 1962
- Nobody Here But Us Pompadours. October 1962
- New York is Different. July 1961
- A Proposition for Women. September 1960
- It's Not the Gift, It's the Wrapping. December 1959
- The Cozy Camel of Winston-Salem. February 1959
- Mutiny of the Bountiful. December 1958.[condensed in Reader's Digest, February 1959]
- Country Doctors Catch Up. April 1958
- Social Work: A Profession Chasing Its Tail. March 1957
- Women in Politics. August 1955

== Book-Length Special Supplements edited for Harper's ==
- Crime and Punishment. April 1964
- The American Female. October 1962
- The Mood of the Russian People. May 1961
- The Crisis in American Medicine. October 1960

== Articles for other publications ==
- Requiem for ERA, The New Republic, November 29, 1975
- Narcotics and the Media. Columbia Journalism Review. Fall 1970
- James Houghton Wants 500,000 More Jobs, New York Times Magazine, Sept 14, 1969
- The Case for a National Service Corps, New York Times Magazine, August 7, 1966 [Reprinted in Social Progress, November–December 1966]
- Issues Girls, Club Ladies and Camp Followers, New York Times Magazine, December 1, 1963
- What's it like to work in the suburbs, Today's Living, May 3, 1959
- The Case of the Vanishing Spinster, New York Times Magazine, September 22, 1963
- Charity Drives? Suburbia Today, October 1963
- The Problem of Labor Union Responsibility, The Society for the Advancement of Management Journal, November 1937 (with V. Henry Rothschild, 2nd)

== Books published ==
- Dorothy Thompson: A Legend in Her Time (Houghton Mifflin 1973)
- The Professional Radical: Conversations With Saul Alinsky (Harper & Row 1970)
- The Crisis in American Medicine (Ed., Harper & Row 1961)
- The Lady and the Vote (Houghton Mifflin 1956)
- With Mortimer S. Edelstein, The Bride Laughed Once (Farrar & Rinehart 1943)

== Personal life ==
On July 3, 1926, she married Theodore Michael Sanders (1890–1965), a physician, in New York, New York. She had two children, Theodore Michael Sanders, a physicist, Ann Arbor, Michigan (b. 1927, d. 2017) and Mary Sanders von Euler, a lawyer and liberal activist, Bethesda, Maryland (b. 1930).

== Political activity ==
In 1952, she ran a grassroots campaign as a Democrat-Liberal for the U.S. Congress in what was then the 28th Congressional District of New York, at the time a heavily Republican District encompassing Delaware County, Orange County, Rockland County, and Sullivan County. In a year when Dwight D. Eisenhower easily won the Presidency, she was unsuccessful in her bid to unseat incumbent Katherine St. George.

== Awards ==
- Kappa Tau Alpha Award for Research in Journalism (1974)
- Front Page award of the Newswomen's Club of New York (1974) for her Harper's piece "Enemies of Abortion, March 1974
- Fellow Society of American Historians (1974)
- Distinguished Alumnae Award, Wellesley College (1973)
