= Elmer Ernest Southard =

American neuropsychiatrist (1876–1920)

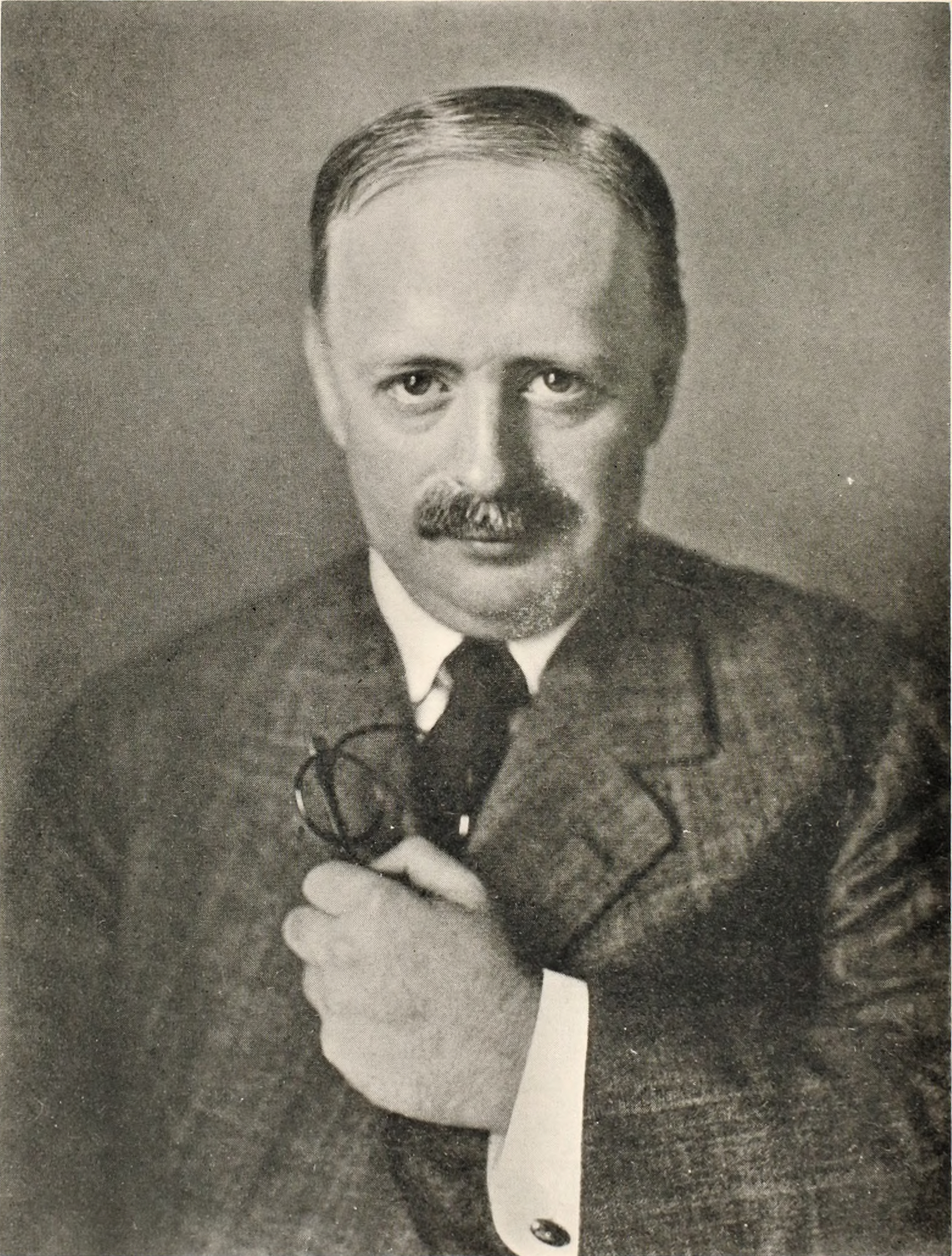
- Born: July 28, 1876; Boston, Massachusetts
- Died: February 8, 1920 (aged 43); New York City
- Education: Harvard Medical School
- Scientific career
- Fields: Neuropsychiatry; Neuropathology
- Workplaces: Boston Psychopathic Hospital

Elmer Ernest (E. E.) Southard (July 28, 1876 – February 8, 1920) was an American neuropsychiatrist, neuropathologist, professor and author. Born in Boston, Massachusetts, Southard lived in the city for nearly his entire life. He attended Boston Latin School and completed his education at Harvard University. At Harvard, Southard distinguished himself as a chess player. After briefly studying in Germany, he returned to the United States as a pathologist at Danvers State Hospital. Southard held academic appointments at Harvard University and its medical school.

He headed the Boston Psychopathic Hospital when it opened in 1912, pioneering the study of brain pathology with particular interests in shell shock and schizophrenia. Southard published several books, including Shell Shock and Other Neuropsychiatric Problems with nearly 1,000 case histories. He was president of the American Medico-Psychological Association and the Boston Society of Psychiatry and Neurology, and held advisory positions with the U.S. Chemical Warfare Service and the Eugenics Record Office.

An influential mentor, Southard guided several well-known figures in medicine and psychology. He worked with neuropathologist Myrtelle Canavan early in her career, and used his influence to obtain a promotion for her in Boston. Southard introduced Karl Menninger to psychiatry, and Menninger later helped establish the foundation which bears his family name. Comparative psychologist Robert Yerkes called Southard "my master of psychopathology."

Southard was married to physician and Wellesley College professor Mabel Fletcher Austin, and they had three children. His interest in chess continued throughout his life, and he enjoyed intellectual gatherings at the home of art collector and friend Walter Arensberg. At the age of 43, Southard died of pneumonia in 1920 during a trip to New York City to deliver lectures to two medical societies.

== Early life ==
Southard was born in Boston in 1876 to Martin Southard and Olive Wentworth Knowles. His paternal ancestors included Mayflower passenger and Plymouth Colony leader Myles Standish. Olive Southard was descended from early residents of New Hampshire and Maine. Frederick Parker Gay, one of E. E. Southard's longtime friends and his posthumous biographer, wrote that Southard's parents were only modestly successful academically. His mother was a schoolteacher for several years; his father, who supervised a cotton-waste factory and established a trucking business, earned enough money to ensure that Southard did not have to work during his undergraduate and graduate studies.

Southard's mother said that once he learned to read, he took full responsibility for his education. He was influenced academically by a paternal aunt, a Greek scholar who had graduated from Oberlin College. One of his cousins was a prominent attorney in Bath, England. Southard attended Boston Latin School, where his father, aunt and headmaster Arthur Irving Fiske sparked a lifelong interest in language and the meaning of words. Despite a tall, solid build and walking about 4 miles (6.4 km) a day to school, he was awkward at manual labor and athletics. Southard graduated from Boston Latin School in 1893 with awards for reading and essay-writing.

He received a Bachelor of Arts degree from Harvard College in 1897. As an undergraduate, Southard's path was shaped by several notable faculty members. He learned about comparative anatomy and the nervous system from biologist George Howard Parker, studied psychology under William James, took a class in logic taught by Josiah Royce and graduated with a degree in philosophy. Southard then entered Harvard Medical School; despite his previous academic success and aptitude for science he struggled in several courses focused on medicine, receiving C's and a D.

At Harvard, Southard was a noted chess player, and was described as Harvard's best player in an 1899 newspaper article on an Ivy League chess tournament: "It is probable that as long as he is engaged in the tournament, Harvard will win the cup." Through the chess team he became lifelong friends with Walter Arensberg, who became a noted art collector.

Southard received his medical degree in 1901. In 1902, Southard went to Germany and studied medicine at the Senckenberg Institute and Heidelberg University for six months.

== Career ==
=== Appointments ===
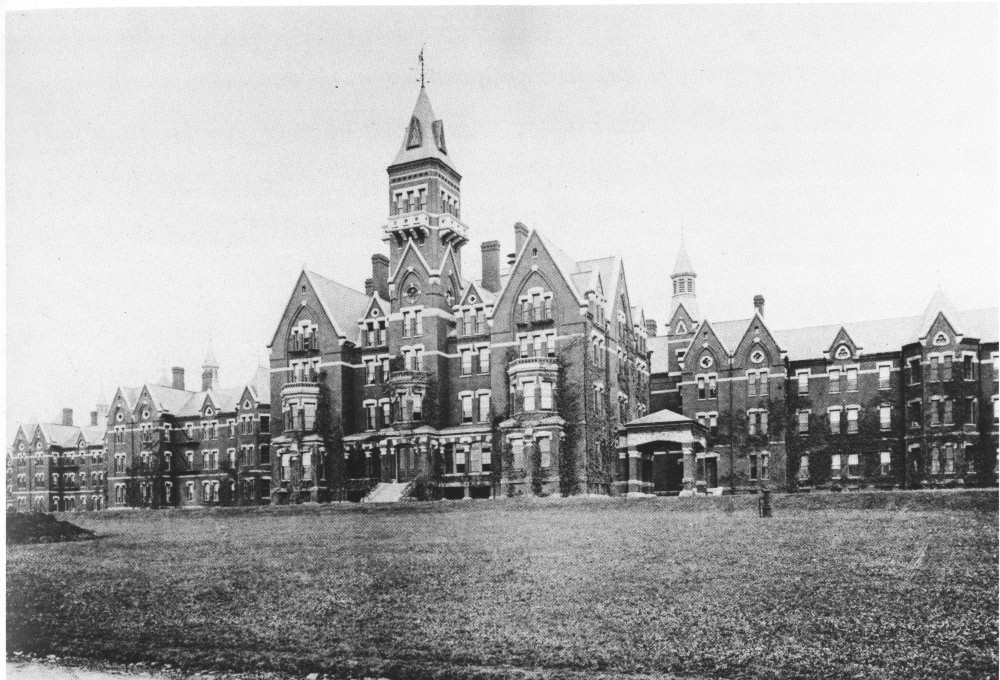
Danvers State Hospital, where Southard held a faculty appointment early in his career

After returning from Germany, Southard interned in pathology at Boston City Hospital and became an instructor at Harvard Medical School in 1904. From 1906 to 1909, he was an assistant pathologist at Danvers State Hospital. Socially, he participated in the Wicht Club with other young Harvard scholars beginning their careers.

In 1909 Southard was named assistant professor of psychology at Harvard University and Bullard Professor of Neuropathology at Harvard Medical School, titles he held until his death. That year, he also became a pathologist for the Massachusetts Commission on Mental Diseases.

Southard and his laboratory assistant, Emma Mooers, contracted a streptococcal infection during an autopsy in 1911. Mooers died and Southard developed lymphangitis in his arm, undergoing aggressive surgery and recovering over several months. Although he wrote an outline of his autobiography and traveled extensively in Europe during his convalescence, he felt unable to concentrate on research and referred to this period as "the wasted year". Southard led the Boston Psychopathic Hospital, which had opened as a department of Boston State Hospital, from 1912 until his death.

He served in a strategic advisory role with the U.S. Army Chemical Warfare Service during World War I, attaining the rank of major. Southard was a past president of the American Medico-Psychological Association, and was president of the Boston Society of Psychiatry and Neurology at his death. Other professional memberships included the American Genetic Association, the National Epilepsy Association, the American Association of Pathologists, the Massachusetts Medical Society and the Society of Experimental Biology. He served in an editorial capacity for several publications, including the Journal of Nervous and Mental Disease.

Southard was a member of the Board of Scientific Directors for the Eugenics Record Office (ERO). Led by biologist Charles Davenport, the ERO lobbied for state sterilization laws and restrictions on U.S. immigration. Public approval of the office waned during the 1930s (when eugenics became associated with Nazism), and the ERO closed in 1939. Southard coined the word "cacogenics" for the study of racial decline.

=== Professional contributions ===
Southard studied the organic basis of mental illness at a time when two camps of professionals (known informally as "brain spot men" and "mind twist men") debated the biological and behavioral origins of psychiatric disorders. His neuropathological perspective was eclipsed after his death by the "mind twist" hypothesis of mental illness promoted by the dynamic psychiatry (or psychobiology) of Adolf Meyer and the psychoanalytic perspectives of Sigmund Freud, Carl Jung and Alfred Adler. Although physiological theories of "autointoxication" were explored in U.S. psychiatry before 1940, Southard had rejected them many years earlier.

During the World War I era, Southard conducted early studies of shell shock. He believed that shell shock resulted from the mind's inability to align the sensory experiences of war with other life events. Southard said that this process, which could also have physical causes, resulted in disorientation and transformed the events of war into a mental condition. In Shell Shock and Other Neuropsychiatric Problems, he called the term "shell shock" advantageous because it "compared with the more acutely terrible and life-in-the-balance thing we know as traumatic or surgical shock." The condition initially captured public interest, at least in part because it was said to be caused by a traumatic force to the head. Once shell shock was no longer thought to result from physical injuries, patients were stigmatized and arguments over its cause interfered with effective treatment.

At the end of the war, Southard returned to Boston State Hospital and it was reorganized. He was relieved of his directorship at Boston Psychopathic and named director of the Massachusetts Psychiatric Institute, a unit of Boston Psychopathic. Free of his previous hospital administration duties, Southard was able to concentrate on research. Southard delineated several priorities for his scientific work and writing. He hoped to publish four books; the first would cover observations from his research laboratory made between 1906 and 1919. The second book, on clinical work he had done at Boston Psychopathic since 1912, he hoped would increase enthusiasm for psychiatric hospitals. The third would report on the expansion of psychiatric social work, and the final work (a requirement of his academic post) would be an overview of neuropathology. In 1924, a bronze table by sculptor Bashka Paeff was installed in the reception of the hospital in his honor,

Although Southard expressed a great deal of interest in research, he was most inclined to work on the classification, nomenclature and definition of psychiatric and philosophical concepts. He said he realized that such work was ridiculed by many, but a "psychiatric dictionary (to include definitions of every near-lying psychological and philosophical term also) would do more to push mental hygiene on than any other single thing I can think of." Southard proposed an eleven-category classification system for psychiatric diagnoses, which was not adopted.

He was particularly interested in dementia praecox (which he favored renaming schizophrenia), and found diffuse anatomic differences in the brains of schizophrenic patients. These changes were ignored or dismissed as artifactual by other investigators for several decades. Serious attention to Southard's findings did not reemerge in the medical literature until the 1990s, but changes in diagnostic criteria complicate the application of Southard's findings to modern schizophrenic patients. Shortly before his death Southard wrote and presented Non-dementia non-praecox: note on the advantages to mental hygiene of extirpating a term, but did not live to see it published.

Southard and Mary Jarrett founded the field of psychiatric social work, applying psychiatry to industrial employees. The Kingdom of Evils, a book on psychiatric social work by Southard and Jarrett, was published after his death. In his introduction to the book, physician Richard Cabot wrote that it highlighted the collaboration between doctor and social worker; the physician excels at diagnosis, and the social worker is better able to provide resources for treatment.

=== Influence ===
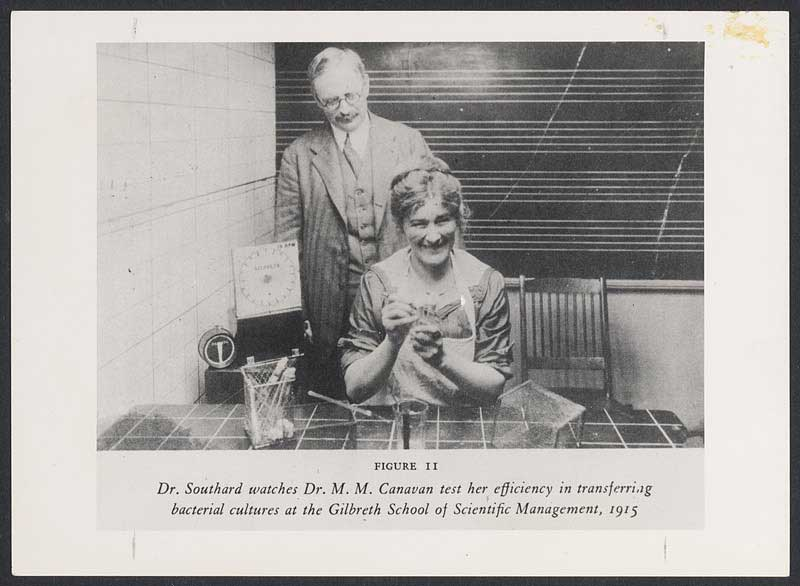
Southard and Myrtelle Canavan

At Danvers State Hospital Southard met Myrtelle Canavan, with whom he worked and published in neuropathology for the next few years. When Canavan received a tempting job offer from the Pennsylvania Hospital for the Insane, in his capacity with the Massachusetts Commission on Mental Diseases, Southard petitioned the board to create a position for her as his assistant, and her salary was enough for her to refuse the Pennsylvania offer.

Southard also mentored Karl Menninger during Menninger's internship at Boston Psychopathic Hospital. Menninger planned to join his father, general practitioner Charles Frederick Menninger, in practice. Southard steered Karl Menninger's interests toward mental health; the Menninger Foundation was later established with a focus on psychiatry, and Karl Menninger became president of the American Psychoanalytic Association. The Menninger family opened the Southard School, a teaching facility for mentally ill children, several years after Southard's death.

Southard had considerable influence on the early career of comparative psychologist Robert Yerkes. Working in the philosophy department at Harvard, Yerkes was passed over for promotions because he had only studied animals. Southard asked him to design mental testing techniques applicable to patients at the psychopathic hospital, and Yerkes received a half-time appointment at Boston Psychopathic with Southard from 1913 to 1917. Shortly afterwards, Yerkes was elected president of the American Psychological Association and developed the U.S. Army's mental testing program during World War I. In his autobiography, Yerkes called Southard "my master of psychopathology."

== Personal life ==
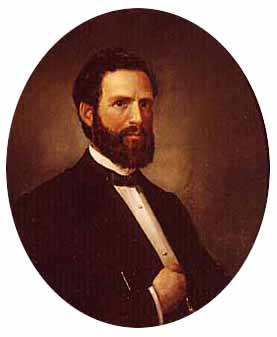
Horace Austin, former governor of Minnesota and Southard's late father-in-law

In 1906 Southard married Mabel Fletcher Austin, a Wellesley College mental-hygiene lecturer and Johns Hopkins University graduate. She was the daughter of former Minnesota governor Horace Austin. Southard wrote to Frederic Parker Gay about the limitations his professional responsibilities placed on his marriage: "Mabel is her own cook, maid and bath steward, as for her being a wife, I have little or no time to be a husband."

Southard had three children: a daughter, Anne, and two sons. His younger son, Ordway, was an early writer of English-language haiku and published under several names, including O. Mabson Southard, O.M.B. Southard and Mabelsson Norway. He was a Communist Party candidate in the 1942 Alabama gubernatorial election. Southard's older son, Austin, developed schizophrenia and committed suicide several years after his father's death.

The elder Southard's life was often busy and sleepless. According to L. Vernon Briggs, a colleague at Boston Psychopathic Hospital, Southard considered himself hypomanic. "He himself said that most people fell within one of the classifications of mental disease, and he felt himself to be of the manic-depressive type. We seldom saw the depressive side of him though it was undoubtedly there; ordinarily he appeared carried away with enthusiasm about his latest interest – and everything worthwhile interested him", Briggs wrote.

Southard experienced chronic headaches and minor seizures (sometimes accompanied by partial vision loss for several hours), which he attributed to mental strain. A 1901 episode kept him in Boston City Hospital for a week, and Southard said he was diagnosed with "acute brain tire". A similar event several years later was diagnosed as vascular neurosis. According to Gay, a physical examination several months before Southard's death may have indicated an endocrine gland problem, but no specific condition was diagnosed.

A member of two local chess clubs, Southard was described in his New York Times obituary as "one of the foremost amateur chess players in America". He often arrived at his laboratory after spending the night playing chess. After his death, in "metaphors more appropriate for a comet than a man", friends described the intellect which allowed Southard to play up to six blind chess matches simultaneously. At Danvers State Hospital, he introduced a move he called the Danvers Opening.

Southard frequently traveled from Boston to New York City to participate in Walter Arensberg's salons, bringing scholarship to discussions of contemporary social science topics. Arensberg was also friends with artists such as Marcel Duchamp. Southard analyzed the dreams of Arensberg's guests, and discussed the meaning of Duchamp's work with the artist. Perhaps influenced by Arensberg and his friends, Southard began to write experimental poetry. He was a member of the Wicht Club, a social and intellectual group of young Harvard academics.

== Death ==
Southard traveled to New York City on February 1, 1920, to lecture to medical societies. He spoke to the Society of Neurology of New York on February 3, and delivered a mental hygiene lecture at the New York Academy of Medicine the following day before developing pneumonia on February 5. Despite care by three Presbyterian Hospital physicians at the Prince George Hotel, Southard died on February 8, at the age of 43.

Canavan became the acting laboratory director at Boston Psychopathic after his death. In 1925 she published Elmer Ernest Southard and His Parents: A Brain Study, following the postmortem dissections of Southard's brain and those of his parents. Canavan undertook the study to examine hereditary links in brain structure. Southard had a prominent frontal lobe, which she associated with his planning ability. Canavan noted small olfactory tracts, and said that Southard had difficulty detecting certain smells. The arteries at the base of his brain were small, but the significance of this finding was unclear. The distinctive features of Southard's brain did not appear in those of his mother or father.

Canavan later wrote that Southard had experienced "singular difficulties producing considerable mental discomfort" during the last year of his life. According to her, he sensed his impending death and felt pressure to complete his unfinished research tasks. Canavan quoted him as saying, "I shall not live long, I must hurry; I must get lots of others busy."

== Works ==
- Outline of Neuropathology (1906)
- Neurosyphilis: Modern Systematic Diagnosis and Treatment, Presented in One Hundred and Thirty-seven Case Histories (1917) – with H.C. Solomon
- Shell-Shock and Other Neuropsychiatric Problems Presented in Five Hundred and Eighty-nine Case Histories from the War Literature, 1914–1918 (1919)
- The Range of the General Practitioner in Psychiatric Diagnosis (1919)
- The Kingdom Of Evils: Psychiatric Social Work Presented In 100 Case Histories (1922, posthumous) – with Mary Jarrett
