= Wagner–Rogers Bill =

Proposed legislation in U.S. Congress

The Wagner–Rogers Bill was proposed United States legislation which would have increased the quota of immigrants by bringing a total of 20,000 Jewish children (there were no sectarian criteria) under the age of 14 (10,000 in 1939, and another 10,000 in 1940) to the United States from Nazi Germany. It was never voted out of committee and no floor vote was ever taken on the bill.

== Legislation ==
The Immigration Act of 1924 (also known as the Johnson-Reed Act), set limits on the number of immigrants from each country who could be admitted into the United States. By 1939, there were more than 300,000 Germans seeking to leave Nazi Germany and emigrate to the United States, which would have taken more than a decade to fulfill under the quota of 27,000 that would have been permitted on an annual basis under existing law. Marion Edwena Kenworthy worked with Clarence Pickett of the Quaker American Friends Service Committee to advocate on behalf of children among the refugees seeking to emigrate.

The bill, largely drafted by Pickett, was jointly sponsored by Senator Robert F. Wagner (D-N.Y.) and Representative Edith Nourse Rogers (R-Mass.) in the wake of the 1938 Kristallnacht attacks on Jews in Germany. The bill was introduced to Congress on February 9, 1939. Though Wagner specified that children "of every race and creed" would be included and the bill submitted did not specify the religion of the 20,000 German refugees who would be targeted, the primary beneficiaries would have been Jewish children.

The bill had widespread support among religious and labor groups. In April 1939, the Non-Sectarian Committee for German Refugee Children was formed, which supported the legislation, including presidents of Stanford University and the University of Chicago.

The bill faced vigorous opposition from nationalist organizations and Democrat Senator Robert R. Reynolds of North Carolina, who threatened to mount a filibuster against it. In direct opposition to the Wagner–Rogers Bill, Reynolds proposed legislation that would restrict all immigration for a decade. Those opposed to the bill argued that the children being admitted would take jobs away from an equal number of "American children" and would become a burden on the government, even with families sponsoring their admission into the country.

President Franklin D. Roosevelt supported the bill, but thought he lacked the wherewithal to overcome congressional resistance. His wife, Eleanor Roosevelt, also expressed support for the bill.

A poll by the American Friends Service Committee found that 35 senators were "in favor" of the bill and 34 "probably in favor", which would have been enough for the bill to pass, but a filibuster would have likely caused problems. Nevertheless, the House Immigration Committee never reported the bill out; eleven members were said to be opposed and eight in favor. Historian Richard Breitman argues that, in addition to general anti-immigration sentiment, anti-semitism also played a substantial role in the bill's eventual defeat.
