= Frederick Parker Gay =

American bacteriologist (1874–1939)

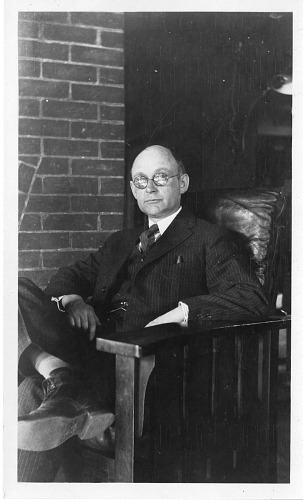
- Photo taken while Gay was a professor at Berkeley
- Born: July 22, 1874; Boston, Massachusetts
- Died: July 14, 1939 (aged 64); New Hartford, Connecticut
- Resting place: Town Hill Cemetery, New Hartford
- Education: Johns Hopkins Medical School
- Known for: The Open Mind(1938)
- Spouse: Catherine Mills Jones
- Children: William, Louisa, Lucia, Parker
- Scientific career
- Workplaces: University of Pennsylvania; Danvers State Hospital; Harvard Medical School; University of California, Berkeley; Columbia University

Frederick Parker Gay (July 22, 1874 – July 14, 1939) was an American bacteriologist who combated typhoid fever and leprosy as well as studied the mechanism of immunity. He was a charter member of the Explorers Club.

== Early life ==
Frederick was born in Boston, Massachusetts, to George Frederick Gay and Louisa Maria Parker. In 1894 he was part of an Arctic expedition led by Frederick Cook.

He graduated from Harvard University in 1897 after a trip around the world. He went to the Philippine Islands in the Spanish–American War fighting Emilio Aguinaldo. He graduated from Johns Hopkins Medical School in 1901. With funding from Rockefeller Institute of Medical Research, he became a demonstrator in pathology at University of Pennsylvania.

== Scientist ==
In 1906 he worked at the Danvers State Hospital in Massachusetts and began to collaborate with Elmer Ernest Southard in the study of anaphylaxis. They induced reactions in guinea pigs with horse serum and published their findings (see Works below).

Traveling in Europe in summers, Gay became acquainted with Jules Bordet in Brussels who was developing a theory of immunity through serology. The analysis studies "the series of events that accompany the struggle between host and infecting organism." Gay investigated the alexin (complement) fixation reaction. In 1907 he became Instructor in pathology at Harvard Medical School, and in 1909 translated Bordet's Studies in Immunity.

In 1910 he became professor of pathology at the University of California, Berkeley. Gay was a faculty sponsor when biology students on campus formed a society called Beta Kappa Alpha. He also provided a typhoid serum and supervised the inoculation of students. He continued to research antibodies and antigens. In 1918 he published his book on typhoid fever, and in 1921 he became Head of the new Department of Bacteriology.

In 1923 Gay became professor of bacteriology at Columbia University; he introduced a graduate study program leading to a Ph.D. His research turned toward the reticulo endothelial system. In 1929 he returned to the Philippines to combat leprosy on the Leonard Wood Memorial Commission. He contributed to Agents of Disease and Host Resistance(1935) concerned with bacteria, fungi, protozoa, rickettsiae and viruses.

He wrote, "The modern study of viruses, though largely in the hands of bacteriologists, has developed new biological, chemical, and physical approaches, and has brought us closer to an enlarged, though by no means final, interpretation of life itself."

Gay retired to a farm in New Hartford, Connecticut.

== Works ==
- 1909: Jules Bordet (Frederick P. Gay translator) Studies in Immunity, John Wiley & Sons, link from Internet Archive.
- 1910: Immunology: A Medical Science Developed through Animal Experimentation, Council on Defense of Medical Research of the American Medical Association, link from HathiTrust.
- 1912: (with G.Y. Rusk) Studies in the Locus of Antibody Formation, Fifteenth International Congress on Hygiene and Demography, link from Biodiversity Heritage Library.
- 1915: (with Karl F. Meyer and Glanville Y. Rusk) Outline of a combined courses in pathology, including bacteriology and protozoology, infection and immunity, experimental pathology, histopathology and morbid anatomy, link from HathiTrust.
- 1918: Typhoid Fever considered as a problem of scientific medicine, link from HathiTrust.
- 1932: "Disease and Death", The Australian Journal of Experimental Biology and Medical Science, Vol.9, No.1, (January 1932), pp. 113-117
- 1938: The Open Mind: Elmer Ernest Southard, 1876–1920, Chicago: Normandie House ISBN 1-163-14765-6.
- "A half-century of bacteriology at Columbia", Columbia University Quarterly 31: 112–39, 203–17.

Papers on anaphylaxis, written in collaboration with Elmer Ernest Southard: The papers were published in the Journal of Medical Research (JMR) which was the publishing arm of the American Association of Pathologists and Bacteriologists:

- 1907: "On serum anaphylaxis in the guinea pig", Journal of Medical Research 16: 143–80.
- 1908: "On the mechanism of serum anaphylaxis and intoxication in the guinea-pig", JMR 18: 407–31.
- 1908: "On recurrent anaphylaxis and repeated intoxication in guinea-pigs by means of horse serum", JMR 19:1–4.
- 1908: "The relative specificity of anaphylaxis", JMR 19: 5–15.
- 1908: "The localization of cell and tissue anaphylaxis in the guinea-pig, with observations of the cause of death in serum intoxication", JMR 19: 17–35.
- 1909: (with J. G. Fitzgerald) "Neurophysiological effects of anaphylactic intoxication", Journal of Medical Research 21: 21–40.
