= Boston State Hospital =

Former psychiatric hospital in Massachusetts, United States

Coordinates: 42°17′15.07″N 71°5′59.20″W

Boston State Hospital is a historic mental hospital located in Mattapan and Dorchester, Massachusetts. The court case Rogers v. Okin, which increases patient consent rights, was filed by a class action lawsuit against the hospital. The hospital was closed in 1979, and has been completely demolished. As of 2002, the site has been redeveloped into new neighborhoods and as part of Mass Audubon's Boston Nature Center and Wildlife Sanctuary.

== History ==
The facility dates back to Boston Lunatic Hospital founded in 1839 by the city and located at First Street in South Boston (now northside of E 1st Street between L and N Streets).

The hospital expanded to the former site of Home for the Poor at Austin Farm in 1887 and male patients transferred to Pierce Farm (Walk Hill and Canterbury Street what became Boston State Hospital) in 1895 when Austin Farms became a female facility. It was renamed Boston Insane Hospital in 1897 after transferring operations under city council to Board of Supervisor of Public Institution and became a Massachusetts state agency in 1908.

The first site was demolished to become Boston Edison Company's South Edison Power Station in 1898 and is now being re-developed as 776 Summer Street.

In 1920 the Psychopathic Department broke off to form Boston Psychopathic Hospital.

The Boston State Hospital closed their site in 1979 and ceased operations in 1981.
