= Massachusetts Mental Health Center =

Historic district in Massachusetts, United States

- Massachusetts Department of Mental Health
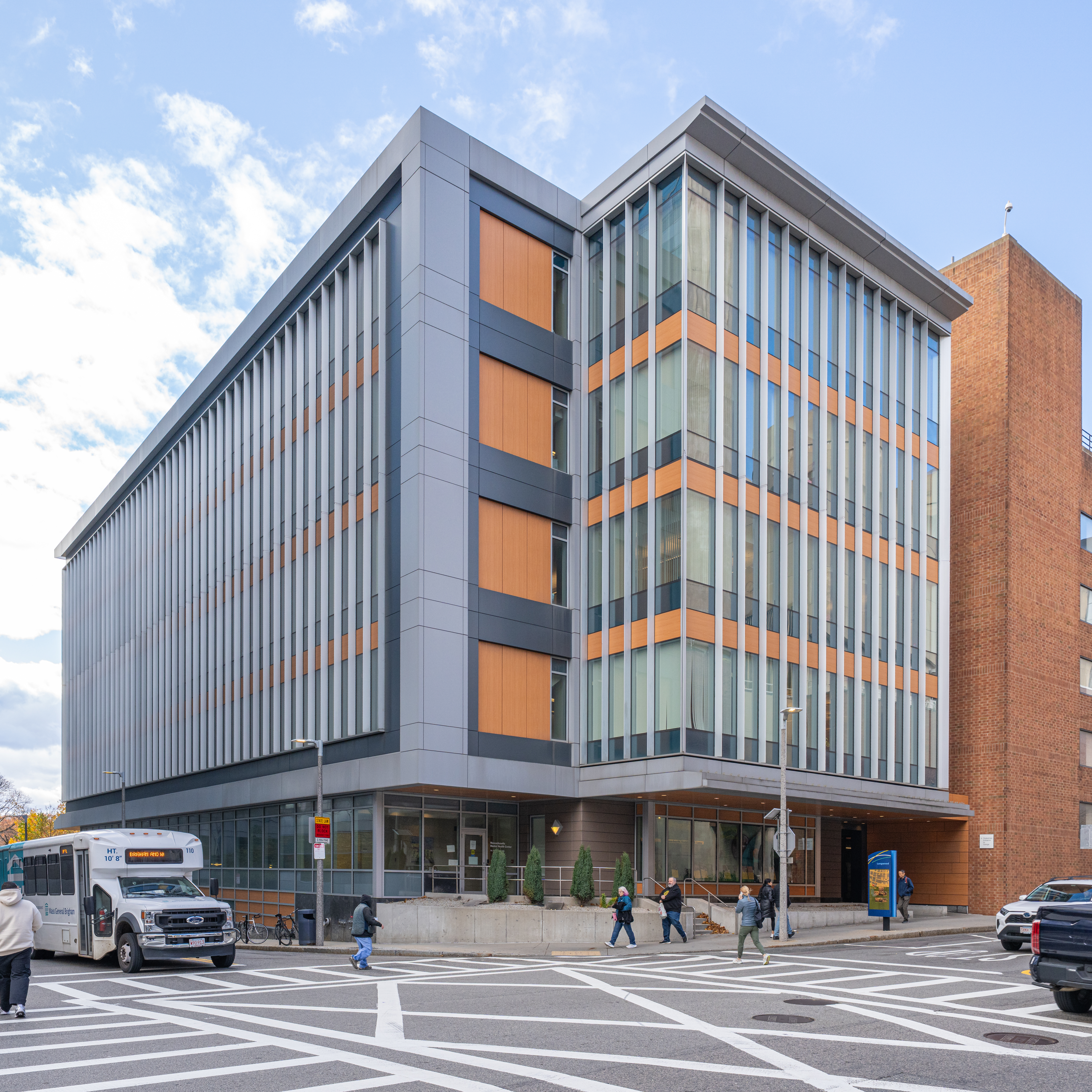

Geography
- Location: Longwood Medical Area, Boston, Massachusetts, United States
- Coordinates: 42.3382°N 71.1060°W

Organization
- Type: Specialist

Services
- Emergency department: No
- Speciality: Behavioral health

History
- Former name: Boston Psychopathic Hospital
- Opened: 1912

Links
- Lists: Hospitals in Massachusetts
- Massachusetts Mental Health Center
- U.S. National Register of Historic Places
- U.S. Historic district
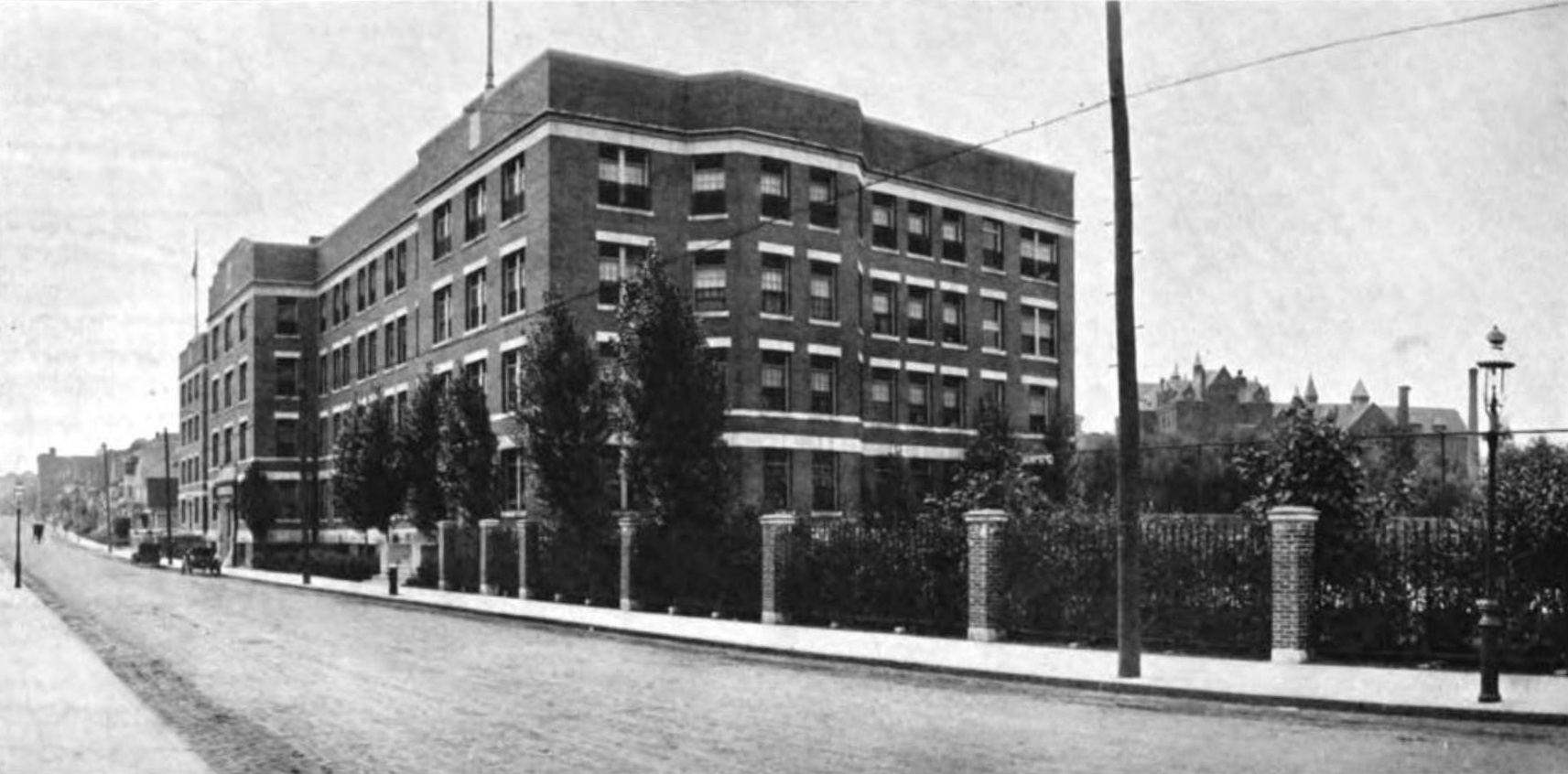
- Boston Psychopathic Hospital, 1922

- Location within Massachusetts Location within the United States
- Location: Boston, Massachusetts
- Built: 1912
- Architect: Kendall, Taylor & Co.
- Architectural style: Late Gothic Revival
- MPS: Massachusetts State Hospitals And State Schools MPS
- NRHP reference No.: 93001489
- Added to NRHP: January 21, 1994

The Massachusetts Mental Health Center is a historic psychiatric hospital complex at 75 Fenwood Road in the Longwood medical area of Boston, Massachusetts.

The center was founded in 1912 as the Boston Psychopathic Hospital. Its original main building and power plant were built that year, with additions in later decades including a therapeutic wing (1954) and research building (1957). The entire property was surrounded by an iron picket fence. It was listed on the National Register of Historic Places in 1994, representing one of the nation's oldest psychiatric hospitals. In 2009 the center's historic campus at 74 Fenwood Road was acquired by Partners HealthCare and demolished the following year. The center continues to operate in modern facilities at 75 Fenwood Road.

== See also ==
- National Register of Historic Places listings in southern Boston, Massachusetts
