= Boston Psychopathic Hospital =

Massachusetts Mental Health Center
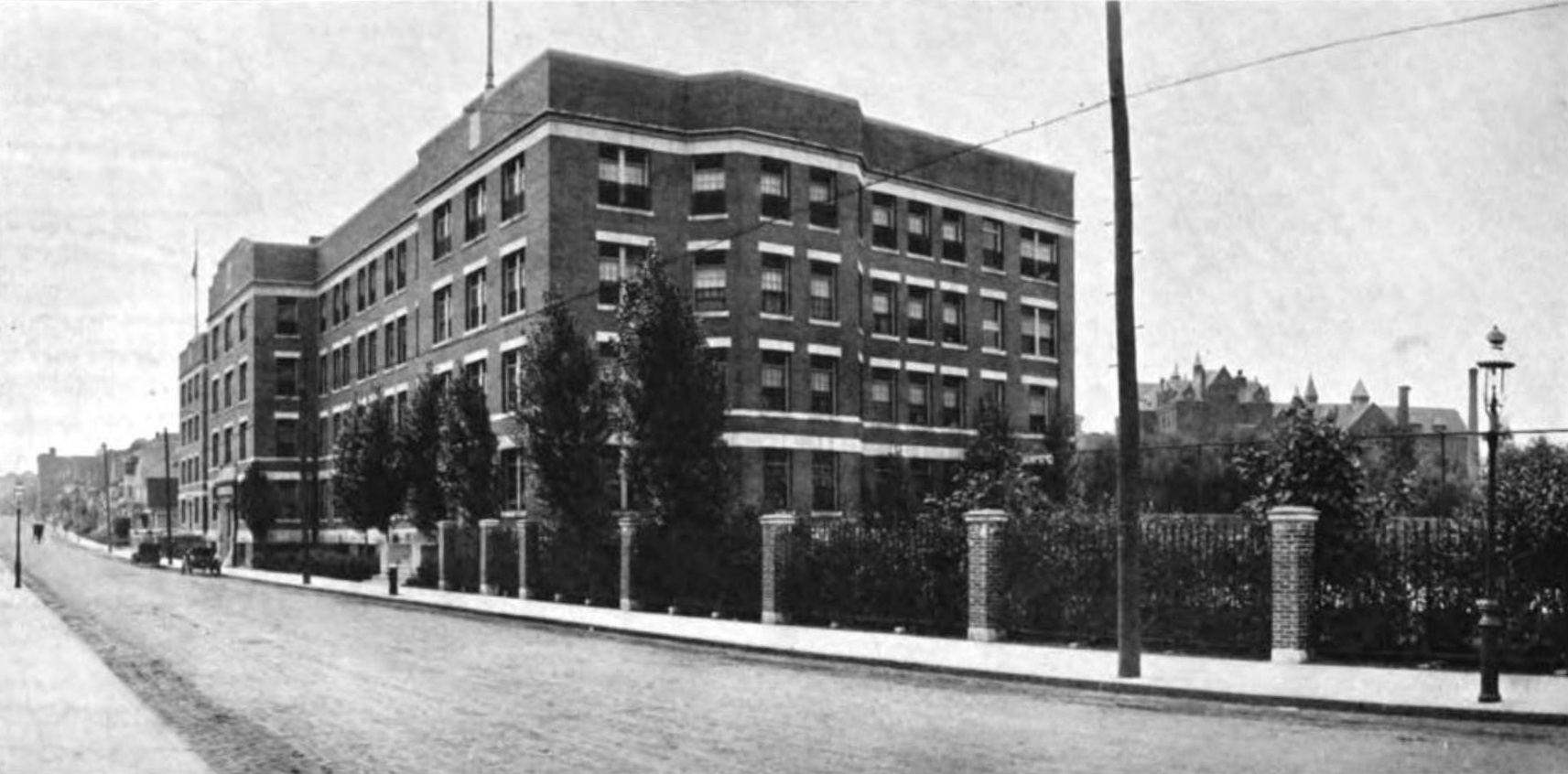

Geography
- Location: 74 Fenwood Road (1912–2010), 75 Fenwood Road (since 2010), Boston, Suffolk County, Massachusetts, United States
- Coordinates: 42°20′8″N 71°6′31″W

Organization
- Type: Specialist

Services
- Speciality: Psychiatric hospital

History
- Former name: Boston Psychopathic Hospital
- Opened: 1912
- Demolished: 2011 (74 Fenwood Road)

Links
- Lists: Hospitals in Massachusetts
- Boston Psychopathic Hospital
- U.S. National Register of Historic Places
- U.S. Historic district
- Location within Massachusetts Location within the United States
- Location: 74 Fenwood Road
- Built: 1912
- Architect: Kendall, Taylor & Co.
- Architectural style: Late Gothic Revival
- MPS: Massachusetts State Hospitals And State Schools MPS
- NRHP reference No.: 93001489
- Added to NRHP: January 21, 1994

The Boston Psychopathic Hospital, established at 74 Fenwood Road in 1912, was one of the first mental health hospitals in Massachusetts, United States. The building was listed on the National Register of Historic Places in 1994. The name was changed to Massachusetts Mental Health Center in the late 1960s. The building at 74 Fenwood Road was closed in 2010 and demolished in 2011. The Massachusetts Mental Health Center continues to operate at 75 Fenwood Road.

== History ==
In November 1909 the site for the hospital was purchased on Fenwood Road, 5 minutes' walk from Harvard Medical School. Elmer Ernest Southard was appointed director of the hospital early in 1910, to supervise its construction. On June 24, 1912 the Psychiatric Hospital was formally opened as a department of Boston State Hospital.

On May 1, 1919 the Massachusetts State Psychiatric Institute was separated from the Psychopathic Department of the Boston State Hospital, which relieved the psychopathic department of scientific research, leaving it with purely hospital functions. On December 1, 1920 the psychopathic department was made into a separate Boston Psychopathic Hospital, under director C. Macfie Campbell. In the late 1960s it was renamed the Massachusetts Mental Health Center.

== Architecture ==
The center was founded in 1912 as the Boston Psychopathic Hospital. Its original main building and power plant were built that year, with additions in later decades including a therapeutic wing (1954) and research building (1957). The entire property was surrounded by an iron picket fence. It was listed on the National Register of Historic Places in 1994, representing one of the nation's oldest psychiatric hospitals. In 2009 the center's historic campus at 74 Fenwood Road was acquired by Partners HealthCare and demolished the following year. The center continues to operate in modern facilities at 75 Fenwood Road.

== See also ==
- National Register of Historic Places listings in southern Boston, Massachusetts
- Massachusetts Mental Health Center

Other hospital with same name

- Massachusetts Mental Health Center at 180 Morton St., Jamaica Plain, MA - 02130 (clinics.com)
